= 45-bit computing =

Computer architecture bit width

In computer architecture, 45-bit integers, memory addresses, or other data units are those that are 45 bits wide. Also, 45-bit central processing unit (CPU) and arithmetic logic unit (ALU) architectures are those that are based on registers, address buses, or data buses of that size.

== Examples ==
Computers designed with 45-bit words are quite rare. One 45-bit computer was the Soviet Almaz ("Diamond") computer.

== See also ==
- 60-bit computing
