= O26 (text editor) =

O26 was a text editor named after the IBM model 026 keypunch (the first character being an alphabetic "O" rather than numeric "0" due to operating system restrictions). The editor could be run on the CDC 6000 series, and later Cyber-70 and -170 series operator consoles. According to source code listings of the SCOPE version of O26, it was written in 1967 by CDC programmers Greg Mansfield and David Cahlander.

== Other early CDC full-screen editors ==
An independently developed full screen editor was written in 1967 by Edgar T. Irons and Franz M. Djorup at the Institute for Defense Analyses to run on a CDC 6600. This editor was described in a later ACM article as operating "from low-cost cathode-ray tube entry and display stations with keyboard and 13 function buttons." The terminals used were CDC 210 display terminals, specially modified with extra function keys. The IDA editor (name not given in the paper) ran on IDA's homegrown time-sharing system known as IDA-CRD.
