= O26 =

O26 or O-26 may refer to:

- O26 (text editor), used on Control Data Corporation (CDC) operator consoles
- Curtiss O-26, an observation aircraft of the United States Army Air Corps
- HNLMS O 26, a submarine of the Royal Netherlands Navy
- Lone Pine Airport, in Inyo County, California, United States
- Oxygen-26, an isotope of oxygen
