= Chippewa Operating System =

Computer operating system for 1960s-era mainframes

Chippewa Operating System (COS)
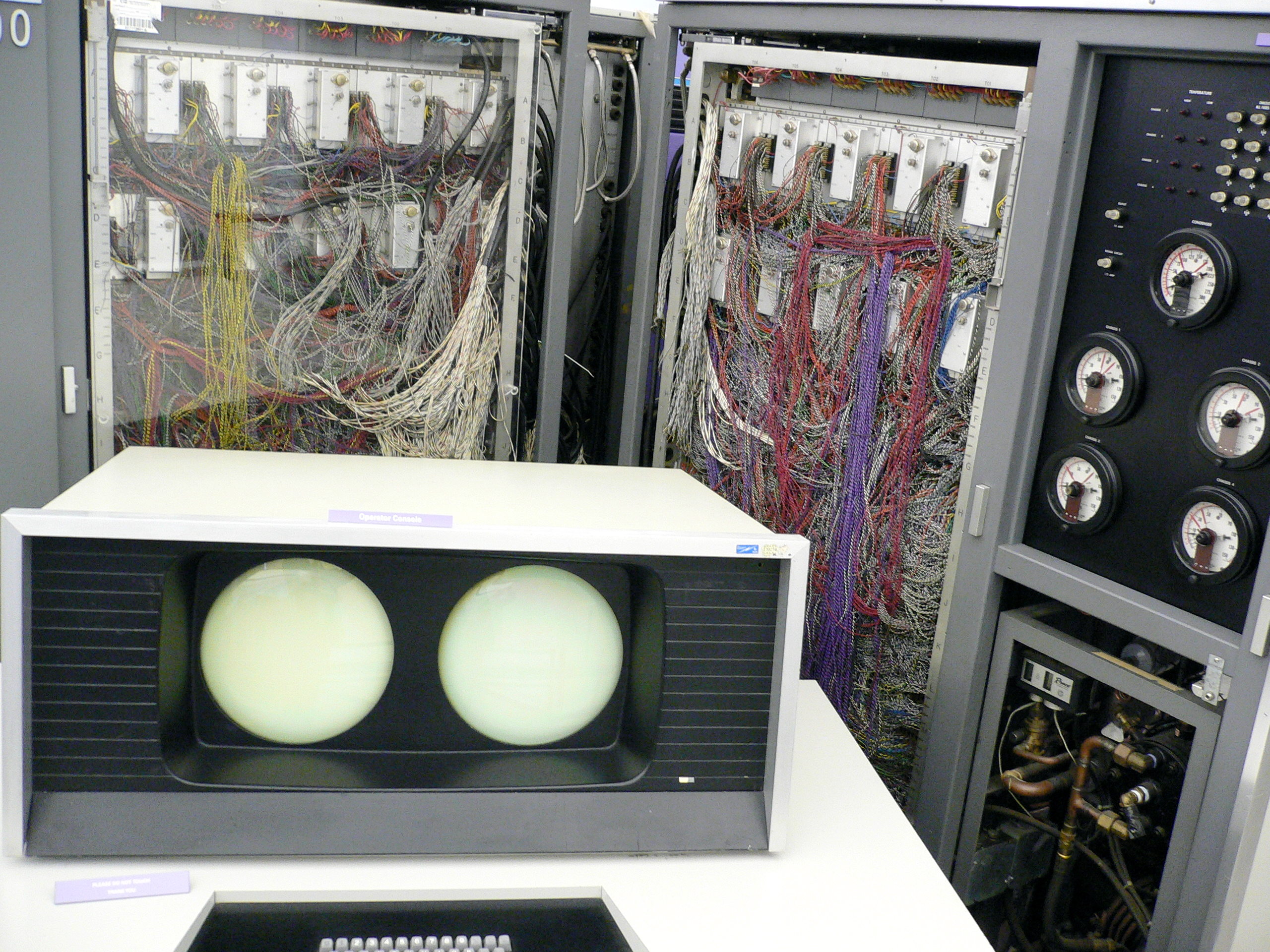
- CDC 6600 with the system console
- Developer: Control Data Corporation
- Working state: Discontinued
- Marketing target: Supercomputers
- Supported platforms: CDC 6600 supercomputer
- Influenced: CDC Kronos, CDC SCOPE
- License: Proprietary
- Succeeded by: CDC SCOPE

The Chippewa Operating System (COS) is a discontinued operating system developed by Control Data Corporation in 1964 for the CDC 6600, generally considered the first supercomputer in the world. The Chippewa was initially developed as an experimental system, but was then also deployed on other CDC 6000 machines.

The Chippewa was a rather simple job control oriented system derived from the earlier CDC 3000. Its design influenced the later CDC Kronos and SCOPE operating systems. Its name was based on the Chippewa Falls research and development center of CDC in Wisconsin.

It is distinct from and preceded the Cray Operating System (also called "COS") at Cray.

== See also ==
- History of supercomputing
- Timeline of operating systems

== Bibliography ==
- Peterson, J. B. (1969). "CDC 6600 control cards, Chippewa Operating System" (PDF). Open-File Report. U.S. Dept. of the Interior. doi:10.3133/ofr69203. Archived from the original on March 1, 2017.
