= CDC Kronos =

Time-sharing operating system

Kronos
- Developer: Control Data Corporation
- Working state: Historic
- Initial release: 1971; 55 years ago
- Latest release: Kronos level 439
- Marketing target: Mainframe computers
- Supported platforms: CDC 6000 series and successors
- Influenced by: Chippewa Operating System
- License: Proprietary

Kronos is an operating system with time-sharing capabilities, written by Control Data Corporation in 1971. Kronos ran on the 60-bit CDC 6000 series mainframe computers and their successors. CDC replaced Kronos with the NOS operating system in the late 1970s, which were succeeded by the NOS/VE operating system in the mid-1980s.

The MACE operating system and APEX were forerunners to KRONOS. It was written by Control Data systems programmer Greg Mansfield, Dave Cahlander, Bob Tate and three others.

== See also ==
- CDC SCOPE
