= 60-bit computing =

Computer architecture bit width

In computer architecture, 60-bit integers, memory addresses, or other data units are those that are 60 bits wide. Also, 60-bit central processing unit (CPU) and arithmetic logic unit (ALU) architectures are those that are based on registers, address buses, or data buses of that size.

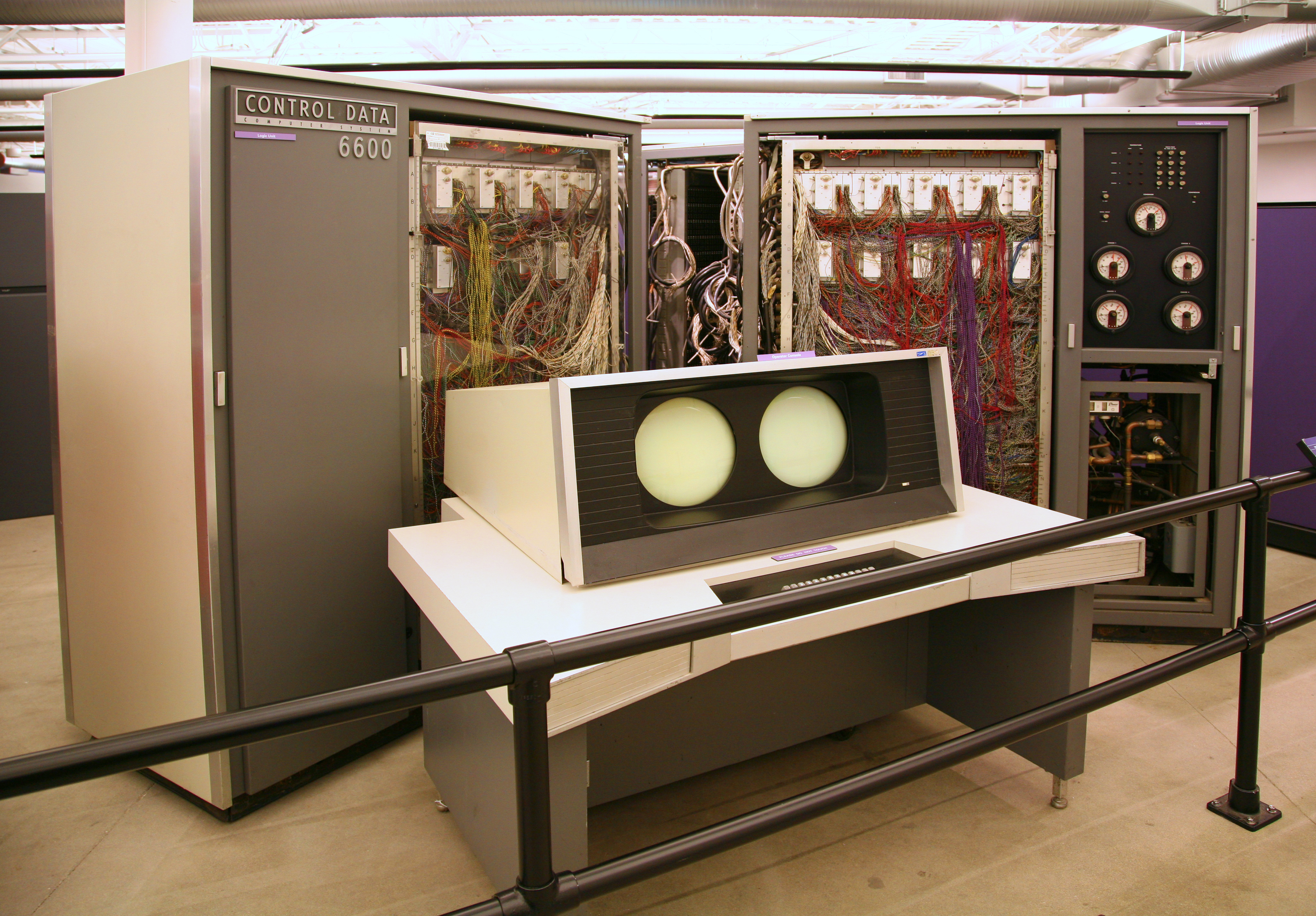
60-bit CDC 6600 introduced in 1964

A 60-bit word is typically used for high-precision floating-point calculations; it can also store 10 6-bit characters.

== Examples ==
The only widely-used computers with 60-bit words were produced by Control Data Corporation (CDC), including the CDC 6000 series, the CDC 7600, and the CDC Cyber 70 and 170 series. Though the addressable unit was the 60-bit word, instructions were either 15 or 30 bits.

Early design documents for the IBM 7030 Stretch tentatively specified its word length as 60 bits; the final design used 64.

== Emulator ==
Museum examples of 60-bit CDC machines exist. There also exists an emulator for the series which will simulate the CDC 60-bit machines on commodity hardware and operating systems.
