= John von Neumann Center =

Supercomputing center in New Jersey, United States

The John von Neumann Center (JVNC) was one of the five pioneering US supercomputer centers created by the National Science Foundation (NSF), established in 1985. The JVNC was the only national center to use the cryogenic ETA10 supercomputer. Named for John von Neumann, the Center was located in Plainsboro Township, New Jersey at Princeton University and operated by The Consortium of Scientific Computing, Inc. an organization of 13 institutes from several states.

The von Neumann center had supported the research of 1,400 from about 100 institutes. Eight industrial corporations utilized the facilities. The NSF cancelled the center’s 69 million dollar, five year funding beyond September 1990. The NSF closed the John von Neumann Center in April 1990.

The facility originally used several Control Data Corporation Cyber 205 computers, and after much delay, received several air-cooled ETA10 computers and one cryogenic ETA10 supercomputer. The first ETA10 was installed after a one-year delay in March 1988. The NSF review panel found that the ETA10 suffered a software failure once every 30 hours, and that its ability to run programs on more than one of its eight processors at any one time was poor. In addition to those computers, the facility had a Pixar H, two Silicon Graphics IRIS, and had video animation capabilities.

ETA Systems, the company that made the ETA10 supercomputers, shut down in April 1989. As a result, the NSF gave the Princeton center a 6-month extension to create an alternate plan. Although the NSF’s peer review panel voted 5-2 to continue NSF support for the facility, as long as the center could raise money to upgrade the requested four-processor Cray Y-MP computer to an eight-processor computer. The center quickly obtained commitments from several of its large users, yet agency officials voted to cancel the decision. Only two of the 10 members of the Princeton center’s consortium of state, industry, and academic users from outside New Jersey had agreed to help fund the $5 million Cray upgrade.

The NSF closed the John von Neumann Center in April 1990.
