= HCR Corporation =

Canadian software company

- Type: Private
- Industry: Computer software
- Founded: 1976; 50 years ago
- Defunct: 1996
- Fate: Acquired by SCO in 1990
- Headquarters: Toronto, Canada
- Key people: Ronald Baecker; Dennis Kukulsky; Michael Tilson
- Products: Unix; Business applications; Development tools
- Revenue: $4 million CAD (1986)
- Number of employees: 48 (1985); 50 (1990)

Human Computing Resources Corporation, later HCR Corporation, was a Canadian software company that worked on the Unix operating system and system software and business applications for it. Founded in 1976, it was based in Toronto.

By a description of one of its founders, HCR was a "UNIX contract R&D and technology development and marketing firm." The company was most known for its extensive knowledge of Unix, for porting Unix to new hardware platforms, for developing compilers as part of the porting work, and for consulting and product development work on Unix. It was a pioneer in the Unix industry and by one account was the second firm ever to commercially support Unix. By 1990 HCR was a prominent player in the Canadian Unix scene.

HCR was acquired by the Santa Cruz Operation (SCO) in 1990. It became the subsidiary SCO Canada, Inc., which existed until 1996 when the Toronto offices were closed.

== Origins at the University of Toronto ==
Human Computing Resources was founded in 1976 by several computer scientists at, and graduates of, the University of Toronto, with the aim of creating computer graphics and systems software. The company was privately held. Foremost among these co-founders was Ronald Baecker, an associate professor in the Department of Computer Science and Electrical Engineering at the University of Toronto and a significant figure and pioneer in the field of human–computer interaction. Baecker served as president of the new firm.

Another co-founder was Michael Tilson, who as a graduate student of Baecker's at the University of Toronto during the mid-1970s was one of the early pioneers of Unix adoption in Canada. An additional co-founder was David Tilbrook, a student of Baecker's who had developed the interactive NewsWhole pagination system for The Globe and Mail, which became an early predecessor to desktop publishing. Other Baecker students who later became well known in the Unix world included Rob Pike and Tom Duff, although neither worked at HCR.

== Formative years ==
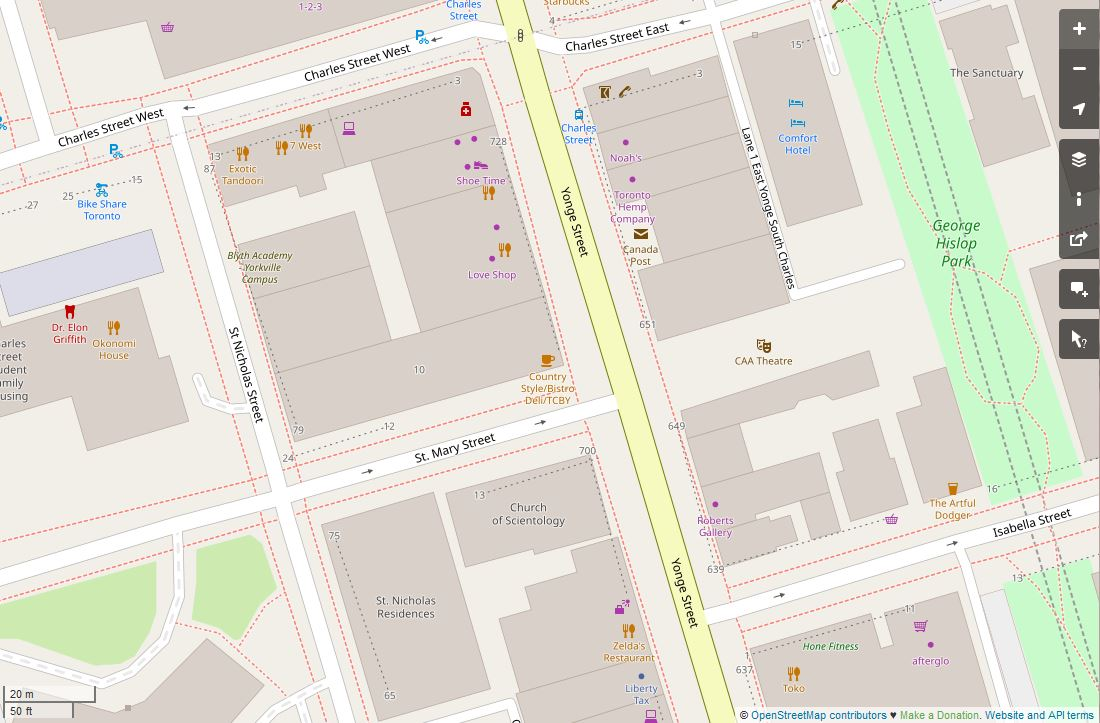
Location of the offices of Human Computing Resources

=== Consulting and contracting ===
The new company's offices were on St. Mary Street, in a mid-century modern building just off Yonge Street in the Bay Street Corridor section of Toronto.

Human Computing Resources initially focused on information technology consulting and contract programming jobs. An early customer for contract work was IBM.

But it also tried to establish a product business, with an effort underway by 1977 to try to market the NewsWhole newspaper layout product. Despite newspapers seeing demonstrations of the product and liking it, they were unwilling to commit their businesses to a product from an unproven, very small software business. In 1979 the NewsWhole product was dropped. As Tilson said in a 1986 interview, "The company quickly discovered that the software industry was not a bed of roses."

In 1978 Human Computing Resources began giving courses in the Toronto area on computers for personal use – the Commodore PET – and for business. By 1979 the new firm had begun exhibiting at the annual Canadian Computer Show and Conference in Toronto. Baecker maintained a part-time involvement in his academic career during this period.

=== Unix specialists ===
Human Computing Resources began to focus on writing software for the Unix operating system, which was starting to gain a foothold outside its Bell Labs founding place. This work began in 1979 when HCR acquired a license to resell Unix from Western Electric Co. By one account, HCR was the second firm to support Unix commercially, following Interactive Systems Corporation in the US in 1977.

Microsoft was working on its version of Unix, called Xenix, and in 1982 engaged with the Santa Cruz Operation (SCO) in this work, with the two companies' engineers working together on improvements. Microsoft and SCO then further engaged HCR in Canada, and a software products group within Logica plc in the United Kingdom, as part of making further improvements to Xenix and porting Xenix to other platforms. In doing so, Microsoft gave HCR and Logica the rights to do Xenix ports and license Xenix binaries in those territories. As a result, some of Xenix was developed by Human Computing Resources in Toronto. The early history of Xenix has a sometimes unclear narrative, but by some accounts HCR had a greater role than just extending what Microsoft had done, as it had to take over the initial porting of the AT&T Version 7 Unix after Microsoft was unable to do so.

In particular, as Baecker said in 2001 for a University of Toronto course he gave on software as a business, HCR's focus became doing "UNIX operating systems programming for hardware companies without UNIX expertise needing to bring UNIX to market quickly." As such, their customer space was in the original-equipment manufacturer (OEM) and value-added reseller (VAR) markets, including Control Data Corporation, NCR, Prime Computer, and National Semiconductor. Tilson published a seven-page article in Byte magazine about their work on the NS16032 as a case study of doing a Unix port. Other architectures they worked on included the Digital Equipment Corporation PDP-11 and VAX-11, Motorola 68000, Intel 8086, Zilog Z8000, PERQ workstation, and Computer Automation 4/95.

This work often included establishing Unix environments and functioning compilers for the C programming language on various 16-bit and 32-bit processors. It also stressed the portability traits, good and bad, of the C language. An employee of HCR in the early 1980s, Richard Miller, had had an especially historic role in Unix, having done, in 1977, one the first ports of Unix to a non-PDP architecture while he was at the University of Wollongong in Australia.

In 1983, the trade magazine InfoWorld stated that HCR "probably has more experience porting UNIX to different architectures than anyone else."

The HCR variant of Unix was branded as Unity. Initially based on UNIX System III, it was sold on a stand-alone basis for the PDP-11 and VAX minicomputers from Digital Equipment Corporation. Moreover, HCR had an implementation of Unity that ran on top of the VAX/VMS operating system, providing file path translations and the ability to use Unix utilities from VMS. In addition, Unity was sold on an OEM basis for other architectures, which in 1983 included the NS16032 and the Motorola 68000.

=== Other products ===
Besides Unix itself, the company was showcasing a variety of system software products. These included a compiler for the Pascal programming language and an interpreter for the BASIC programming language. Cross compilers from VAX Unix to the NS16032 architecture for C, Pascal, and Fortran 77 were also offered. There was a Unix-based RT-11 emulator. For operating system usability, there was the configurable HCR Menu Shell, which ran atop the standard Bourne shell and provided a more friendly and customizable interface, and the HCR/EDIT screen-oriented text editor.

In addition, HCR often worked with, and did active marketing for, the Mistress relational database system, which was supported commercially by Rhodnius Ltd, another Toronto-based software firm. HCR also marketed several business applications. By 1983, UNIX Review trade publication was referring to HCR as a "well-known software vendor".

=== Financials ===
By one account, HCR received funding in 1982 and 1983 from two Canadian venture capital firms, Ventures West Technologies and TD Capital Group, with the two combined ending up with 50 percent ownership of HCR; more money was subsequently raised by diluting existing shares. By another account, HCR received $750,000 CAD from one round of venture capital funding in 1981 and $2.2 million from another round in 1984, with Ventures West Technologies being one of the firms involved.

The company was profitable during some of these years. Revenues rose from $1.3 million CAD in 1982 to $2.2 million in 1983 to $3.2 million in 1984, with Unix porting contracts with hardware manufacturers ranging from $100,000 to $1 million in size. Some 80 percent of the company's sales came from the United States, 15 percent from Europe, and 5 percent from Canada itself. Marketing costs were minimal since those were borne by the hardware manufacturers for selling complete systems.

There was competition, as other companies were in this area. In addition to Interactive Systems Corporation and SCO, companies doing Unix ports or substantial work with Unix included UniSoft, Microport, and a number of smaller firms.

As Unix began to penetrate into wider consciousness in the 1980s, employees at HCR became Unix evangelists. They were quoted in newspaper articles as the operating system became more discussed in technology circles and appeared in overseas symposiums with the likes of Unix inventors and pioneers Ken Thompson, Brian Kernighan, Samuel J. Leffler, and P. J. Plauger. HCR gave training courses in Unix. From its Toronto offices, HCR provided Unix training courses and executive seminars on the importance and impact of Unix, and offered introductory Unix seminars at various North American cities. Between 1982 and 1985, HCR staff published a dozen articles for, or presented at conferences of, the USENIX association, and HCR hosted the Summer 1983 USENIX conference in Toronto where some 1,600 Unix users were in attendance.

Overall, however, HCR did not focus on one specific mission. In his 2001 course on software as a business, Baecker spoke of the "Three Product Strategies of HCR", and began by being critical of the time he was in charge of the company, saying that its strategy reflected his personality: "the academic, the visionary, ... go everywhere, which is to have no focus and to go nowhere".

== Change in leadership ==
In February 1984, Baecker stepped down as president of HCR, and returned on a more active basis to the faculty of the University of Toronto. He was replaced as president by Dennis Kukulsky, formerly a national sales manager with Tektronix. Baecker remained as chairman of the company.

Under Kukulsky, the company sought to focus on software products that would run on Unix, and in particular, products aimed at business users. Indeed, the promise of producing business applications was part of what had attracted venture capital funding and part of why Kukulsky had been hired. The company was faced with a significant loss for 1985, due to increased development, sales, and marketing costs, including opening sales offices in the United States.

HCR released the Chronicle Business Applications Software suite in 1985. HCR's Chronicle included modules for general ledger, accounts payable, and accounts receivable, as well as inventory, invoicing, purchase orders, and sales and profitability analysis.

This was followed by HCR's Chariot UNIX Business Software, which sold for around $7,500 per development system. It included the business application modules of Chronicle but more importantly contained a 4GL-like application generator to allow HCR's customers to create new business applications or tailor existing ones. Chariot was aimed at value-added resellers (VARs) and ran on the DEC VAX, IBM PC AT, AT&T 3B, and NCR Tower. Chariot was well received in computer industry trade shows, and some 1,500 VARs signed up for it or otherwise indicated interest. But HCR was short on both time and money and the promised delivery date of February 1986 was not met, and even had Chariot been ready for release, the company lacked the ability to market it effectively.

These business products were not successful, with very little actual revenue coming in from them and substantial development costs being incurred. Overall, Human Computing Resources went through the same tribulations as many software firms, such as a failing to accurately predict development costs and being unsure how to market products once developed. One executive commented to the Financial Post that when it came to software, "Pricing is a black art."

Baecker's course analysis spoke critically of this era of the company as well, saying that it had embodied Kukulsky's personality of "the salesman, the opportunist ... go where the money is, i.e., 4GLs for UNIX, an area in which HCR had no expertise".

== Change of name and another change in leadership ==
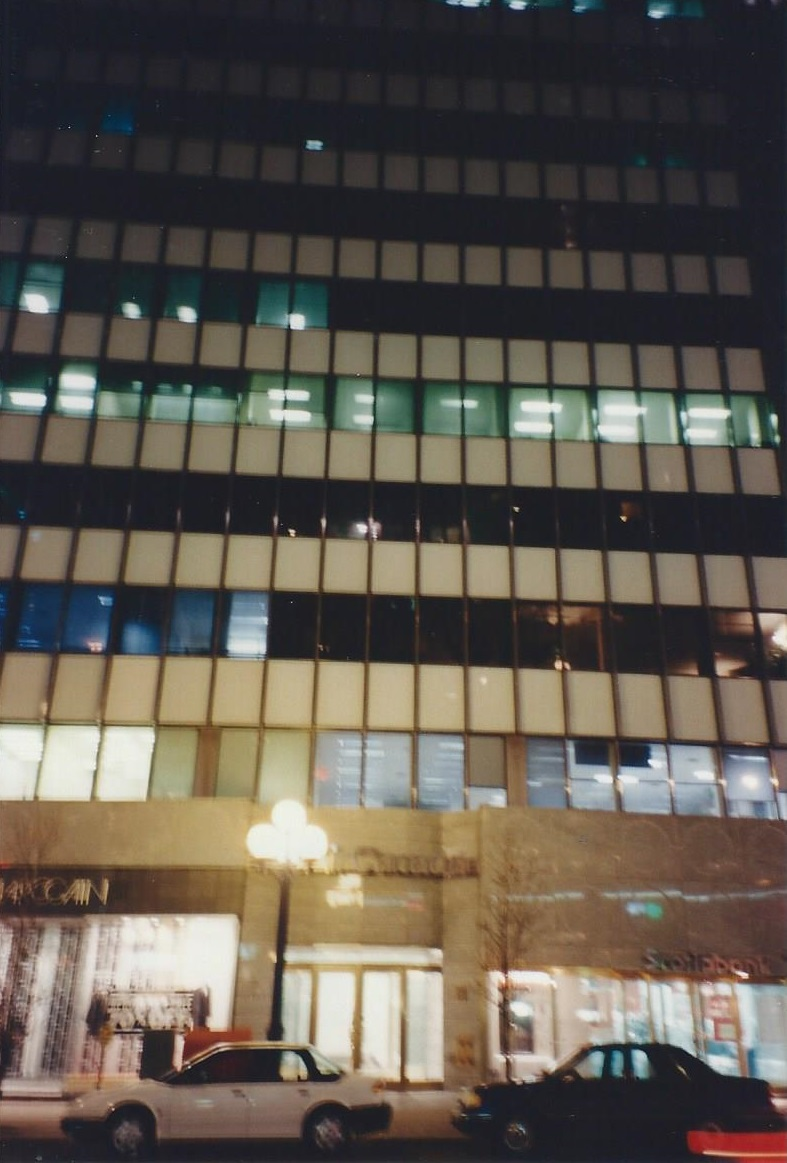
The 10th floor of this office building at 130 Bloor Street West in Toronto (here seen in 1999) housed the offices of HCR Corporation and later SCO Canada, Inc.

The fallout from the Chariot project was such that by July 1986, Kukulsky had resigned and co-founder Tilson was president of the company. Tilson had previously been serving as vice president of technical development. The company's management divested itself of the business products, deciding to return its focus to system software and developers. Staffing reductions took place as well.

The changes resulted in HCR becoming profitable again, with earnings of around $100,000 on revenue of $4 million.

By 1987, the official name of the company had changed to HCR Corporation. Principal ownership of the company was split among five venture capital investors, who together owned 70 percent of HCR. The headquarters office had moved as well, now being located in a Bloor Street building in the Yorkville neighborhood of Toronto, a short distance from the previous site.

The firm continued to have a visible presence in the Unix industry. Tilson gave a talk at the Unix-focused AUUG about what Unix might look like thirteen years out in the year 2000. In 1989 the Canadian branch of UniForum named Tilson the Man of the Decade for his work on Unix.

The company continued to do complex Unix porting work, such as having a contract with ETA Systems to develop a C compiler and port Unix System V with Berkeley Software Distribution networking improvements to that company's ETA10 vector processor supercomputer. Similarly, HCR had a contract with Intel to develop C and Fortran 77 compilers for the iWarp parallel computing supercomputer architecture. HCR used the Bell Labs Portable C Compiler (pcc) as a starting point for much of this kind of work, but they had developed components of their own, such as a portable intermediate-code global optimizer that fit into the pcc scheme.

The company's management made one of its focuses be on development tools. By 1989 HCR was still a vendor for a BASIC interpreter and Pascal compiler, and had added a compiler for the burgeoning C++ programming language that was based on AT&T's Cfront. Their advertisements for the HCR/C++ product emphasized the multiple platform packaging, documentation, and support services that came with it. HCR was an early participant in the ISO C++ standardization effort.

HCR also provided validation services and a test suite for C compilers. In 1990, HCR announced the release of the SuperTest suite, in collaboration with Associated Computer Experts (ACE) of the Netherlands, which included nearly 400,000 separate tests of C compiler conformance and quality.

In addition, HCR developed and sold the Configuration Control Menu System, or CoCo. This product was designed to manage change requests and supported a form of code review based around email available on Unix platforms. A survey article in Software Engineering Notes pronounced CoCo an "interesting tool" that could be used in conjunction with existing Unix-based configuration management commands such as SCCS.

During the Unix Wars of the late 1980s, HCR was affiliated on the Unix International side.

By 1990, HCR had around 50 employees. The company did not disclose its annual revenues at that point.

In Baecker's course analysis of the company's strategic history, he summarized this period as reflecting Tilson's nature of "the technologist, the pragmatist, the realist ... go where HCR had expertise, i.e., UNIX software development tools (unfortunately, too late)". However, Tilson's recollections revealed a more positive view: "My role as CEO was to turn the company around with greater focus on core business. The ultimate result was to be acquired as a healthy business with a good return for shareholders and new opportunities for employees."

== Acquisition by SCO ==
The Santa Cruz Operation (SCO), an American company based in Santa Cruz, California, announced on 9 May 1990 that it was acquiring HCR Corporation. Financial terms were not disclosed but the companies said it would be a "share swap with a multimillion dollar value." The acquired entity would take on the name SCO Canada, Inc., and operate as an independent subsidiary company. The office remained at the same Bloor Street address. Tilson remained head of the operation and became a vice president of SCO. The two companies had been both allies and competitors at different times in the past, as had the software products group of Logica (which had been part of the early Xenix work, and which SCO had previously acquired in 1986).

The HCR acquisition allowed SCO to improve its development tools offerings, especially for the recently released SCO OpenDesktop operating system. SCO Canada also took over work on the existing SCO Microsoft C compiler that dated back to Xenix days; it was offered in addition to the pcc compiler as part of the SCO OpenDesktop Development System. SCO Canada continued to sell the HCR C++ product, which by 1991 had an estimated 450 licensed sites using it, and maintained a role in the language's standardization effort.

SCO Canada also took on some other work, such as looking to provide strategic partners with porting assistance to SCO Unix, and doing integration work between SCO Unix and Novell NetWare.

In September 1995, it was announced that SCO was buying the UnixWare and related Unix business from Novell, which in turn had acquired it from Unix Systems Laboratories in 1993. The New Jersey office of Novell had a languages and development tools group with more advanced technology than what SCO Canada had been working with, and that made the SCO Canada engineering staff largely redundant once the Novell deal was closed in December 1995. The SCO Canada office was shut down in early 1996.
