= Xedit =

Xedit or XEDIT may refer to:

- X11 Xedit, a text editor for the X Window System on Linux and UNIX
- XEDIT, a visual text editor for the VM/CMS operating system
- Xedit, a command-line based text editor for CDC computers running the NOS operating system
