= Cybil (programming language) =

Cybil (short for the Cyber Implementation Language of the Control Data Network Operating System) is a Pascal-like programming language developed at Control Data Corporation for the Cyber computer family. Cybil was used as the implementation language for the NOS/VE operating system on the CDC Cyber series and was also used to write the eOS operating system for the ETA10 supercomputer in the 1980s.
