= CDC 1700 =

The CDC 1700 is a 16-bit word minicomputer, manufactured by the Control Data Corporation with deliveries beginning in May 1966.

Over the years there were several versions. The original 1700 was constructed using air-cooled CDC 6600-like cordwood logic modules and core memory, although later models used different technology. The final models, called Cyber-18, added four general-purpose registers and a number of instructions to support a time-sharing operating system.

System name	Processor	Minimum RAM	Maximum RAM	Cycle time
1700	1704	4 KW	32 KW	1.1 μs
1714	1714	12 KW	64 KW	1.1 μs
SC1700	1774	4 KW	32 KW	1.5 μs
System 17	1784	4 KW	64 KW	0.9 or 0.6 μs
CYBER 18	MP17	16 KW	128 KW	0.75 μs

== Hardware ==
The 1700 uses ones' complement arithmetic and an ASCII-based character set, and supports memory write protection on an individual word basis. It has one general-purpose register and two indexing registers (one of which was implemented as a dedicated memory location). The instruction set is fairly simple and supports seven storage addressing modes, including multilevel (chained) indirect addressing.

Although described as a 16-bit system, the basic core storage memory is 4,096 18-bit words, each comprising

- 16 data bits
- a parity bit, and
- a program protection bit;
  memory could be expanded to 32,768 words; I/O was in units of 8 or 16 bits.

=== Peripherals ===
Available peripherals included teletypewriters, paper tape readers/punches, punched card readers/punches, line printers, magnetic tape drives, magnetic drums, fixed and removable magnetic disk drives, display terminals, communications controllers, Digigraphic display units, timers, etc. These interfaced to the processor using unbuffered interrupt-driven "A/Q" channels or buffered Direct Storage Access channels.

== Software ==
The main operating systems for the 1700 were the Utility System, which usually took the form of several punched paper tapes (resident monitor plus utilities), a similar Operating System for larger configurations (often including punched cards and magnetic tape), and the Mass Storage Operating System (MSOS) for disk-based systems.

An assembler and a Fortran compiler were available. Pascal was also available, via a cross compiler on a CDC 6000 series host. The Cyber 18 series, exploiting the extended instruction set, ran a disk-based OS, the Interactive Terminal Oriented System (ITOS). This system supported Fortran, Cobol, and UCSD Pascal. ITOS was a foreground/background system with multiple users connected via serial CRT terminals; user tasks ran in the background while the operating system itself ran in the foreground.

== Market acceptance ==
The 1700 series found use as communications concentrators, Digigraphics workstations, remote batch job entry stations, and industrial process controllers. One application, running the AUTRAN program, controlled water and wastewater treatment plants for many years. Another was used as Maintenance and Diagnostic SubSystem (M&DSS) for the AN/FPQ-16 Perimeter Acquisition Radar Attack Characterization System (PARCS), located at Cavalier Air Force Station (CAFS) in North Dakota; this CDC 1700 is still being used as of this writing (2016).

Washington, D.C. used a Control Data 1700 in vote-tallying. CDC's 1700 was also used by Ticketron as central servers for their wagering systems and ticketing services.

=== Simulation ===
In mid-2016, John Forecast added a CDC 1700 simulator to the SIMH package.

== Photos ==
- CDC 1700 Control Panel
- Control Data 1700
