= Computer module =

Circuit board within a computer

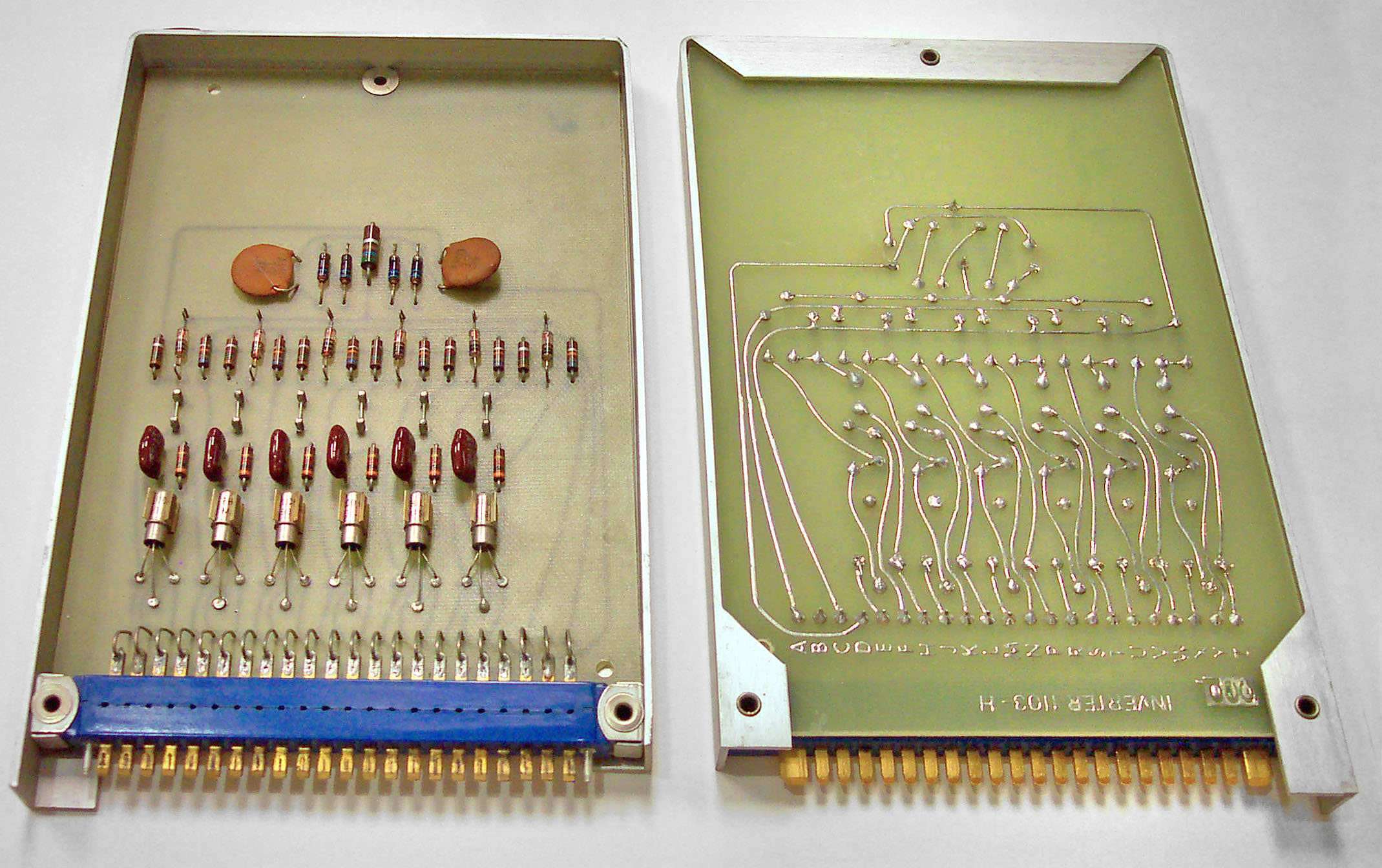
DEC's original products were individual modules, like these System Building Blocks 1103 hex-inverter cards (both sides).

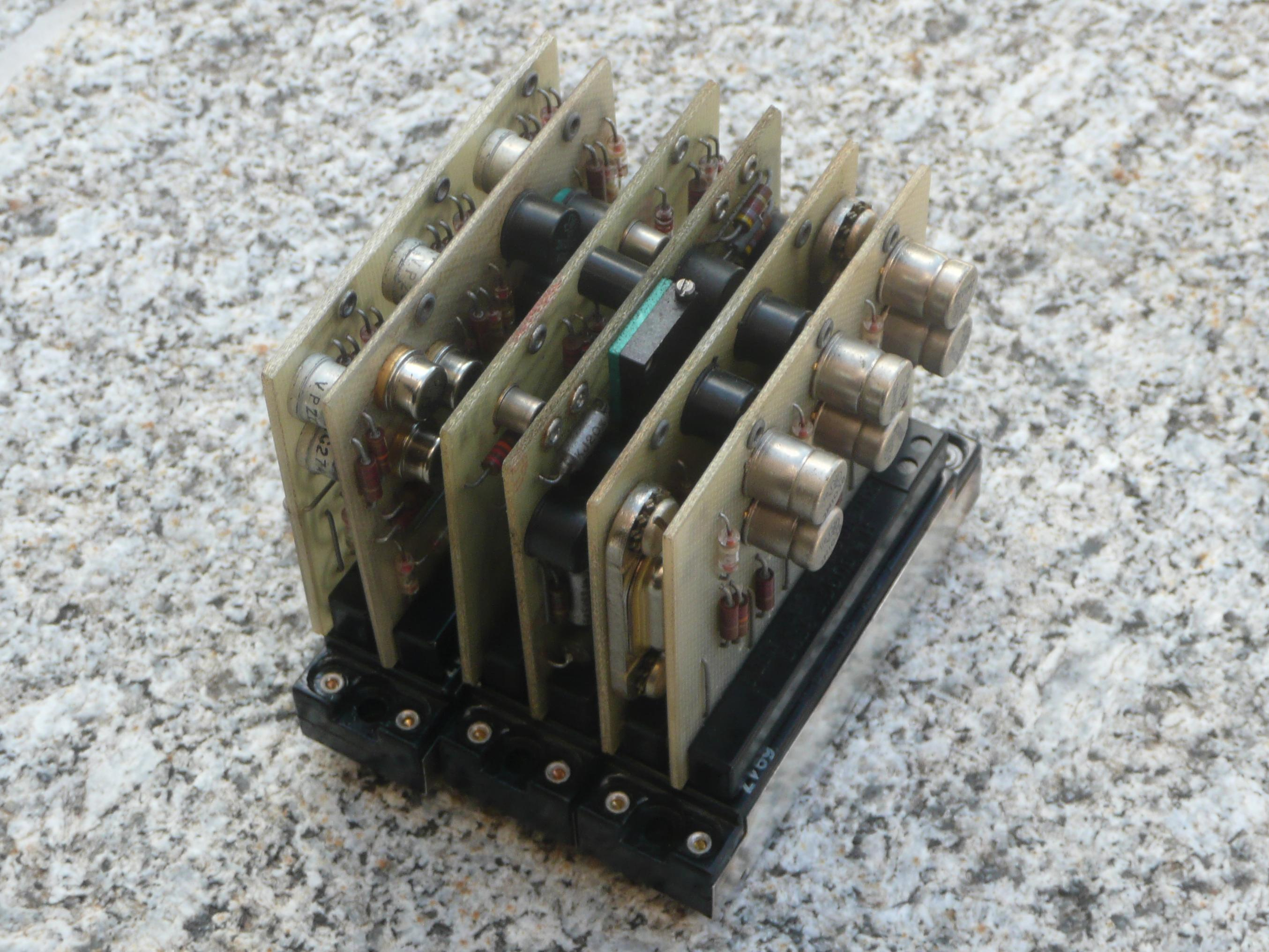
CDC used much smaller modules in their early computers.

A computer module is a selection of independent electronic circuits packaged onto a circuit board to provide a basic function within a computer. An example might be an inverter or flip-flop, which would require two or more transistors and a small number of additional supporting devices. Modules would be inserted into a chassis and then wired together to produce a larger logic unit, like an adder.

== History ==
Modules were the basic building block of most early computer designs, until they started being replaced by integrated circuits in the 1960s, which were essentially an entire module packaged onto a single computer chip. Modules with discrete components continued to be used in specialist roles into the 1970s, notably high-speed modular designs like the CDC 8600, but advances in chip design led to the disappearance of the discrete-component module in the 1970s.

== See also ==
- Modularity
