= ETA Systems =

American supercomputer manufacturer

- Industry: Computers
- Founded: August 1983; 42 years ago
- Defunct: 1989
- Headquarters: Bloomington, Minnesota, United States
- Products: ETA-10
- Owner: William Norris
- Parent: Control Data Corporation

ETA Systems was a supercomputer company spun off from Control Data Corporation (CDC) in the early 1980s in order to regain a footing in the supercomputer business. They successfully delivered the ETA-10, but lost money continually while doing so. CDC management eventually gave up and folded the company.

== Historical development ==
Seymour Cray left CDC in the early 1970s when they refused to continue funding of his CDC 8600 project. Instead they continued with the CDC STAR-100 while Cray went off to build the Cray-1. Cray's machine was much faster than the STAR, and soon CDC found itself pushed out of the supercomputing market.

William Norris was convinced the only way to regain a foothold would be to spin off a division that would be free from management prodding. In order to regain some of the small-team flexibility that seemed essential to progress in the field, ETA was created in 1983 with the mandate to build a 10 GFLOPS machine by 1986.

In April 1989 CDC decided to shut down the ETA operation and keep a bare-bones continuation effort alive at CDC. At shutdown, 7 liquid-cooled and 27 air-cooled machines had been sold. At this point ETA had the best price/performance ratio of any supercomputer on the market, and its initial software problems appeared to be finally sorted out. Nevertheless, shortly thereafter CDC exited the supercomputer market entirely, giving away remaining ETA machines free to high schools through the SuperQuest computer science competition.

== Products ==
ETA had only one product, the ETA-10. It was a derivative of the CDC Cyber 205 supercomputer, and deliberately kept compatibility with it. Like the Cyber 205, the ETA-10 did not use vector registers as in the Cray machines, but instead used pipelined memory operations to a high-bandwidth main memory. The basic layout was a shared-memory multiprocessor with up to 8 CPUs, each capable of 4 double-precision or 8 single-precision operations per clock cycle, and up to 18 I/O processors.

The main reason for the ETA-10's speed was the use of liquid nitrogen (LN_{2}) cooling in some models to cool the CPUs. Even though it was based on then-current CMOS technologies, the low temperature allowed the CPUs to operate with a ~7 ns cycle time, so a fully loaded ETA-10 was capable of about 9.1 GFLOPS. The design goal had been 10 GFLOPS, so the design was technically a failure. Two LN_{2}-cooled models were designated ETA-10E and ETA-10G. Two slower, lower-cost air-cooled versions, the ETA-10Q and ETA-10P (code named "Piper") were also marketed.

The planned successor to the ETA-10 was the 30 GFLOPS ETA-30.

== Software ==
Software for the ETA-10 line was initially regarded as a disaster. When CDC and ETA first designed the ETA architecture, they made the conscious decision not to merely port the CDC VSOS operating system from the existing CDC Cyber 205. It was felt by both the vendor, and the existing customer base (who wrongly believed that their vendor knew best), that a new OS needed to be written to extract the best performance from the hardware.

When the first ETA-10 E initially shipped in 1986 there was no operating system for the machines. Programs had to be loaded one at a time from an attached Apollo Computer workstation, run, and then the supercomputer rebooted to run the next program.

At the time Unix was making major inroads into the supercomputing fields, but ETA decided to write their own EOS operating system, which wasn't ready when the first machines were delivered in late 1986 and early 1987. An operating system based on UNIX System V became available in 1988, as a result of porting work done under contract by the Canadian firm HCR Corporation, at which point it looked like the machine might finally succeed. Many sites that had refused to pay for their machines due to the low quality of EOS found ETA's UNIX completely usable and were willing to accept delivery.

ETA's demise was not based solely on operating system choice or existence. The Fortran compiler (ftn200) had not changed significantly from the CDC205. This compiler retained vendor-specific programming performance features (known as the Q8* subroutine calls) in an era when supercomputer users were realizing the necessity of source code portability between architectures. Additionally, the compiler optimizations were not keeping up with existing technology as shown by the Japanese supercomputer vendors such as NEC, or at Cray Research and the newer minisupercomputer makers.

In general, computer hardware manufacturers prior and up to that period tended to be weak on software. Libraries and available commercial and non-commercial (soon to be called open-source) applications help an installed base of machines. CDC was relatively weak in this area.

== Naming the firm ==
Neil Lincoln, chief architect, asserts that ETA is not an acronym, and otherwise means nothing, not even the well known acronym of "estimated time of arrival." In point of fact, he says that he would not have named the firm that so as to dissociate it from ETA, the Basque separatist group, or the Eta, the Japanese social minority (especially as Japan was considered a market). According to one of the CPU designers at ETA, Neil told a story that his sons actually came up with the name: apparently a linotype machine has characters arranged in the order of frequency used in the English language and the first three letters were used.

Another theory also asserts the name was chosen based on the frequency of English alphabet letters due in part to the then current popularity of Douglas Hofstadter's 1980 book Gödel, Escher, Bach which used ETAOIN, etc., to capitalize on popularity and current hip-ness.

A third, completely plausible theory, is that ETA was a successor name to the much earlier Engineering Research Associates ERA: Engineering Technology Associates. Norris and others have denied this.

== See also ==
- Thomas Jefferson High School for Science and Technology won one of the donated ETA-10 supercomputers
- EOS was the initial operating system developed by ETA Systems
- Unix was the later, more popular operating system
