= NOS (operating system) =

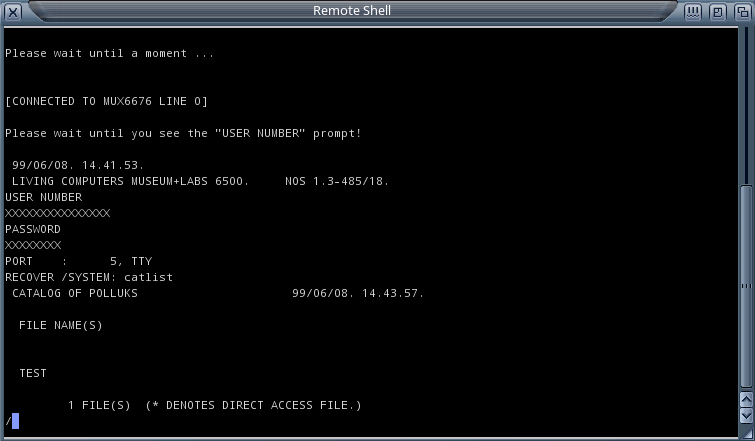
- Login procedure
- Developer: Control Data Corporation
- Working state: Historic
- Initial release: 1975; 50 years ago
- Latest release: NOS 2.8.7 L871 (Y2K fixed)
- Marketing target: Mainframe computers
- Platforms: CDC 6000 series and successors
- License: Proprietary

CDC NOS Version 1 Terminal User's Instant Manual

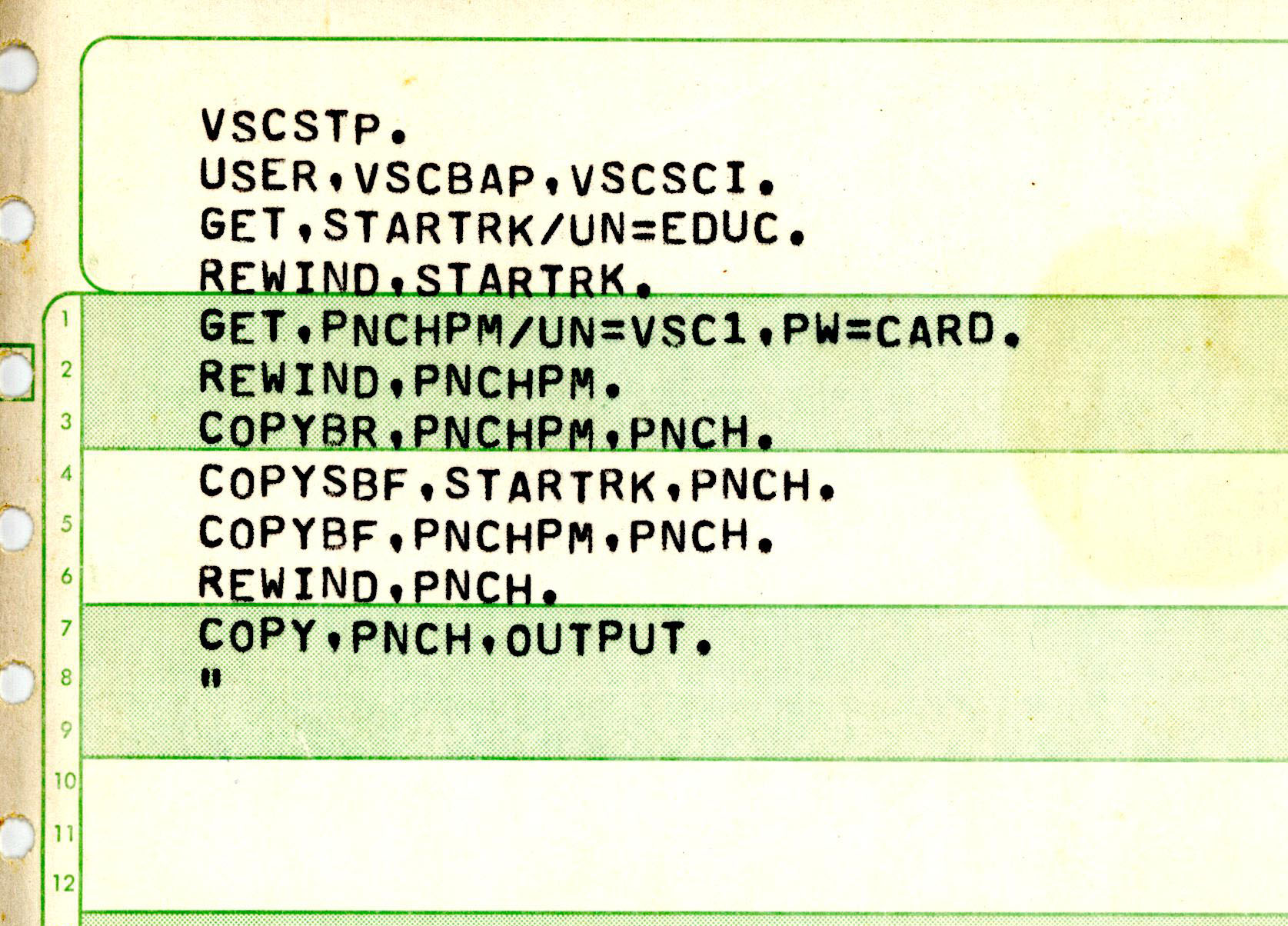
A batch file to get the file STARTRK and output it to the card punch

NOS (Network Operating System) is a discontinued operating system with time-sharing capabilities, written by Control Data Corporation in 1975.

NOS ran on the 60-bit CDC 6000 series of mainframe computers and their successors. NOS replaced the earlier CDC Kronos operating system of the 1970s. NOS was intended to be the sole operating system for all CDC machines, a fact CDC promoted heavily. NOS was replaced with NOS/VE on the 64-bit Cyber-180 systems in the mid-1980s.

Version 1 of NOS continued to be updated until about 1981; NOS version 2 was released early 1982.

== Time-sharing commands ==
- ACCESS – selects the access subsystem
- APL – selects APL programing language
- ASCII – select fill 128-character ASCII
- ATTACH – links to a permanent file
- AUTO – automatically generate five-digit line numbers
- BASIC – selects BASIC system
- BATCH – selects the batch system
- BEGIN – starts processing of CCL procedure (control language file)
- BINARY – selects binary input mode
- BRIEF – suppresses headers
- BYE – log off the system
- CALL – starts processing KCL procedure file (control language before CCL)
- CATLIST – lists user's permanent files
- CHANGE – changes parameters of a permanent file
- CHARGE – set charge number and project number
- CLEAR – releases all local files
- CONVERT – converts character sets
- (CR) – Carriage Return – requests terminal status if it is the first thing on a line
- CSET – selects the terminal character-set mode
- DAYFILE – lists a record of the user's activity
- DEBUG – activates or terminates CYBER interactive Debug
- DEFINE – create a direct-access permanent file
- DIAL – sends a one-line message to another terminal
- EDIT – Selects the text editor
- ENQUIRE – Requests the current job status
- EXECUTE – selects the Execute subsystem
- FORTRAN – selects the FORTRAN subsystem (FORTRAN 5)
- FTNTS – Selects the FORTRAN Extended Version 4 compiler (CDC's enhanced version of FORTRAN 4)
- FULL – Selects full-duplex mode
- GET – gets a copy of a permanent file
- GOODBYE – same as BYE
- HALF – clears full-duplex mode
- HELLO – logs out and starts login
- HELP – gets descriptions of NOS commands
- LENGTH – requests the length of a file
- LIB – get a copy of a permanent file
- LIMITS – lists the user's limits
- LIST – lists the contents of a file
- LNH – same as LIST except no headers
- LOGIN – same as HELLO
- LOGOUT – same as BYE
- MONITOR – connects to a terminal
- NEW – creates a new primary file
- NORMAL – clears modes set by ASCII, AUTO, BRIEF, NOSORT, CSET, PARITY, and TAPE
- NOSORT – prevents the system from sorting the primary file on the subsequent command
- NULL – selects the null subsystem.
- OLD – gets a copy of a permanent file
- P – proceed
- PACK – compress a file with several logical records into one logical record
- PACKNAM – direct subsequent file requests to an auxiliary device
- PARITY – set terminal parity
- PASSWOR – change user password
- PERMIT – grants another user permission to access a file
- PRIMARY – makes temporary file the new primary file
- PURGE – removes permanent files
- RECOVER – allows user to resume after terminal was disconnected
- RENAME – changes file name
- REPLACE – replace the contents of a permanent file with a temporary file
- RESEQ – resequence or add line numbers to the primary file
- SAVE – save a file permanently
- SETASL – sets SRU account block limit (SRU = System Resource Unit, on hard drive)
- SETTL – set CPU time limit
- SORT – sort the primary file
- STATUS – same as ENQUIRE
- STOP – terminates currently running programs
- SUBMIT – submit a batch job deck image
- TRAN – select NOS transaction subsystem
- USER – get terminal number
- X – process a time-sharing command as a batch command
- XEDIT – select XEDIT editor

From NOS Version 1 Terminal User's Instant Manual, CDC, 1975–1980.

== See also ==
- CDC Kronos
- CDC SCOPE
- CDC display code
