= NOS/VE =

- Developer: Control Data Corporation
- Working state: Historic
- Initial release: 1980s
- Marketing target: Mainframe computers
- Platforms: CDC Cyber 180 series and successors
- License: Proprietary

NOS/VE (Network Operating System / Virtual Environment) is a discontinued operating system with time-sharing capabilities, written by Control Data Corporation in the 1980s. It is a virtual memory operating system, employing the 64-bit virtual mode of the CDC Cyber 180 series computers. NOS/VE replaced the earlier NOS and NOS/BE operating systems of the 1970s.

== Commands ==
The command shell interface for NOS/VE is called the System Command Language, or SCL for short. In order to be callable from SCL, command programs must declare their parameters; this permits automatic usage summaries, passing of parameters by name or by position, and type checking on the parameter values. All standard NOS/VE commands further follow a particular naming convention, where the form of the command is verb{_adjective}_noun; these commands could be abbreviated with the first three characters of the verb followed by the first character(s) of all further words. Examples:

Full command	Abbreviation	UNIX command
display_catalog	disc	ls
display_working_catalog	diswc	pwd
change_working_catalog	chawc	cd
delete_catalog	delc	rmdir
copy_file	copf	cp
delete_file	delf	rm
create_connection	crec	telnet

Inspired by addressing structure-members in various programming languages, the catalog separator is the dot.

Subsystems like FTP integrate into the command shell. They change the prompt and add commands like get_file. Thereby statements like flow-control stay the same and subsystems can be mixed in procedures (scripts).

== Parameters ==
Commands could take parameters such as the create_connection command:

crec telnet sd='10.1.2.3'

would connect you to IP address 10.1.2.3 with telnet service.

== See also ==
- NOS
- CDC Kronos
- NOS/BE
