= CDC STAR-100 =

1974 supercomputer

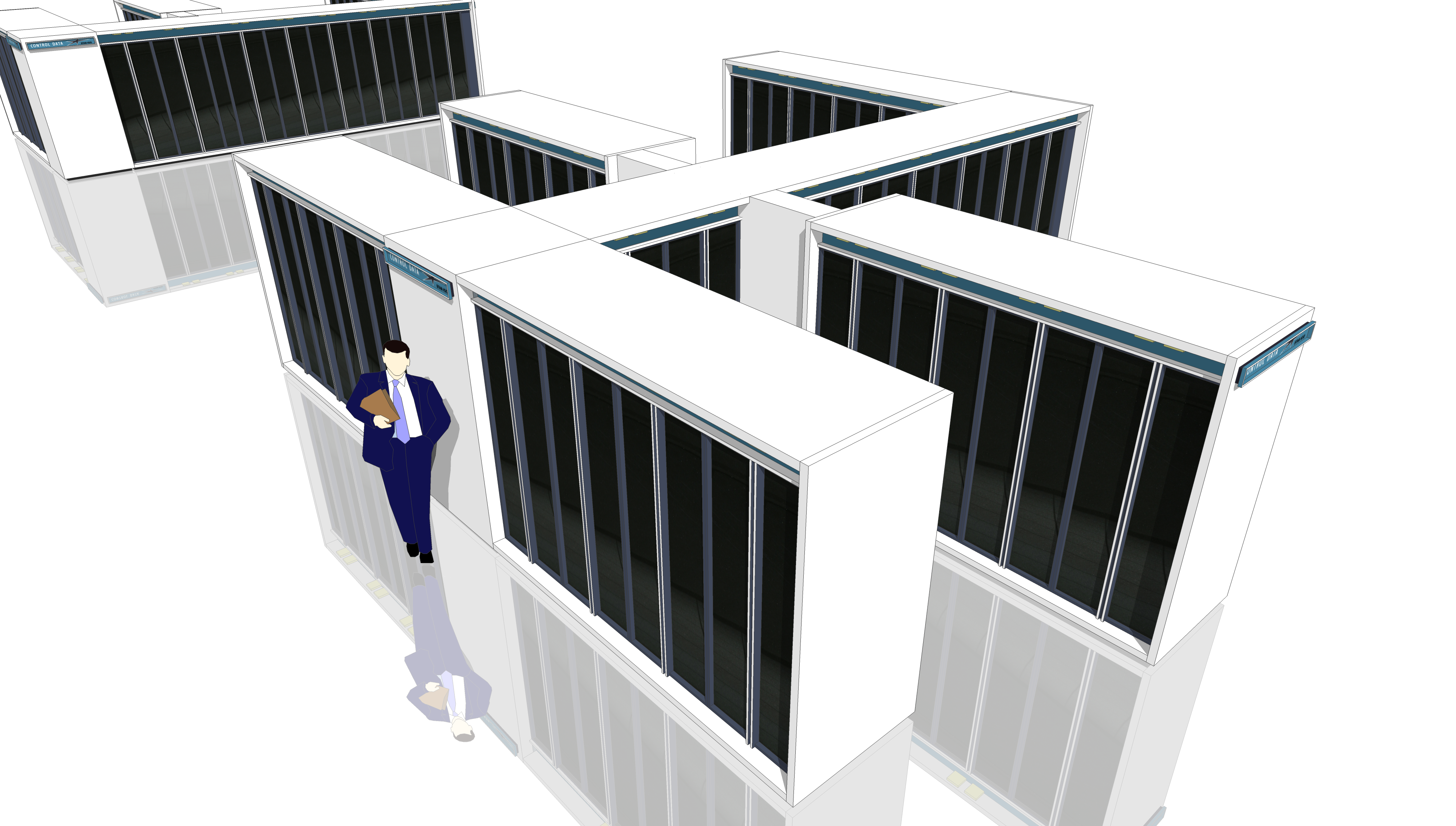
- Two CDC STAR-100, in 8 MB version (forefront) and 4 MB version (background)

Design
- Manufacturer: Control Data Corporation
- Designer: Jim Thornton
- Release date: 1974

Casing
- Dimensions: Full computer approx: Height: 212 cm (83 in); Length: 745 cm (293 in); Internal sections: Height: 76 in (190 cm); Width: 28.5 in (72 cm); Depth: 30 in (76 cm)
- Weight: 2,200 pounds (1,000 kg)
- Power: 250 kW @ 208 V 400 Hz

System
- Operating system: HELIOS
- CPU: 64-bit processor @ 25 MHz
- Memory: Up to 8 megabytes (4 * 4 * 64K x 64 bits)
- Storage: -
- MIPS: 1 MIPS (Scalar)
- FLOPS: 100 MFLOPS (Vector)
- Predecessor: -
- Successor: CDC Cyber 200

The CDC STAR-100 is a vector supercomputer that was designed, manufactured, and marketed by Control Data Corporation (CDC). It was one of the first machines to use a vector processor to improve performance on appropriate scientific applications. It was also the first supercomputer to use integrated circuits and the first to be equipped with one million words of computer memory.

The name STAR is a blend of STrings (of binary digits) and ARrays. The 100 alludes to the nominal peak processing speed of 100 million floating-point operations per second (MFLOPS); the earlier CDC 7600 provided peak performance of 36 MFLOPS but more typically ran at around 10 MFLOPS.

The design was part of a bid made to Lawrence Livermore National Laboratory (LLNL) in the mid-1960s. Livermore was looking for a partner who would build a much faster machine on their own budget and then lease the resulting design to the lab. It was announced publicly in the early 1970s, and on 17 August 1971, CDC announced that General Motors had placed the first commercial order for it.

A number of basic design features of the machine meant that its real-world performance was much lower than expected when first used commercially in 1974, and was one of the primary reasons CDC was pushed from its former dominance in the supercomputer market when the Cray-1 was announced in 1975. Only three STAR-100 systems were delivered, two to LLNL and another to NASA Langley Research Center.

== Description ==
The STAR has a 64-bit architecture, consisting of 195 instructions. Its main innovation was the inclusion of 65 vector instructions for vector processing. The operations performed by these instructions were strongly influenced by concepts and operators from the APL programming language; in particular, the concept of "control vectors" (vector predicate masks in modern terminology), and several instructions for vector permutation with control vectors, were carried over directly from APL.

The vector instructions operated on vectors that were stored in consecutive locations in main memory; memory addressing was virtual. The vector instructions fed an arithmetic pipeline; a single instruction could add two variable-length vectors of up to 65,535 elements with just one instruction fetch. The STAR also fetched vector operands in 512-bit units (superwords), reducing average memory latency.

Since the memory location of the "next" operand is known, the CPU can fetch the next operands while it is operating on the previous ones. As with instruction pipelines in general, the time needed to complete any one instruction was no better than it was before, but since the CPU is working on a number of data points at once, the overall performance dramatically improves.

Many of the STAR's instructions were complex, especially the vector macro instructions, which performed complex operations that normally would have required long sequences of instructions. These instructions, along with the STAR's generally complex architecture, was implemented with microcode.

Main memory had a capacity of 65,536 512-bit words, called superwords (SWORDs). Main memory was 32-way interleaved to pipeline memory accesses. It was constructed from core memory with an access time of 1.28 μs. The main memory was accessed via a 512-bit bus, controlled by the storage access controller (SAC), which handled requests from the stream unit. The stream unit accesses the main memory through the SAC via three 128-bit data buses, two for reads, and one for writes. There is also a 128-bit data bus for instruction fetch, I/O, and control vector access. The stream unit serves as the control unit, fetching and decoding instructions, initiating memory accesses on the behalf of the pipelined functional units, and controlling instruction execution, among other tasks. It also contains two read buffers and one write buffer for streaming data to the execution units.

The STAR-100 has two arithmetic pipelines. The first has a floating point adder and multiplier, and the second can execute all scalar instructions. It also contains a floating point adder, multiplier, and divider. Both pipelines are 64-bit for floating point operations and are controlled by microcode. The STAR-100 can split its floating point pipelines into four 32-bit pipelines, doubling the peak performance of the system to 100 MFLOPS at the expense of half the precision.

The STAR-100 uses I/O processors to offload I/O from the CPU. Each I/O processor is a 16-bit minicomputer with its own main memory of 65,536 words of 16 bits each, which is implemented with core memory. The I/O processors all share a 128-bit data bus to the SAC.

== Real-world performance, users and impact ==
The STAR-100's real-world performance was a fraction of its theoretical performance for a number of reasons. Firstly, the vector instructions, being "memory-to-memory," had a relatively long startup time, since the pipeline from the memory to the functional units was very long. In contrast to the register-based pipelined functional units in the 7600, the STAR pipelines were much deeper. The problem was compounded by the fact that the STAR had a slower cycle time than the 7600 (40 ns vs 27.5 ns). So the vector length needed for the STAR to run faster than the 7600 occurred at about 50 elements; if the loops were working on data sets with fewer elements, the time cost of setting up the vector pipeline was higher than the time savings provided by the vector instruction(s).

When the machine was released in 1974, it quickly became apparent that the general performance was disappointing. Very few programs can be effectively vectorized into a series of single instructions; nearly all calculations will rely on the results of some earlier instruction, yet the results had to clear the pipelines before they could be fed back in. This forced most programs to pay the high setup cost of the vector units, and generally the ones that did "work" were extreme examples. Worse, basic scalar performance was sacrificed to improve vector performance. Any time that the program had to run scalar instructions, the overall performance of the machine dropped dramatically. (See Amdahl's Law.)

Two STAR-100 systems were eventually delivered to the Lawrence Livermore National Laboratory and one to NASA Langley Research Center. In preparation for the STAR deliveries, LLNL programmers developed a library of subroutines, called STACKLIB, on the 7600 to emulate the vector operations of the STAR. In the process of developing STACKLIB, they found that programs converted to use it ran faster than they had before, even on the 7600. This placed further pressures on the performance of the STAR.

The STAR-100 was a disappointment to everyone involved. Jim Thornton, formerly Seymour Cray's close assistant on the CDC 1604 and 6600 projects and the chief designer of STAR, left CDC to form Network Systems Corporation. An updated version of the basic architecture was later released in 1979 as the Cyber 203, followed by the Cyber 205 in 1980, but by this point systems from Cray Research with considerably higher performance were on the market. The failure of the STAR led to CDC being pushed from its former dominance in the supercomputer market, something they tried to address with the formation of ETA Systems in September 1983.

== Installations ==
Five CDC STAR-100s were built. Deliveries started from 1974:

- Control Data Corporation, Arden Hills, MN (2)
- Lawrence Livermore National Laboratory. (2)
- NASA Langley
