= Honeywell 800 =

Mainframe computer introduced in 1958

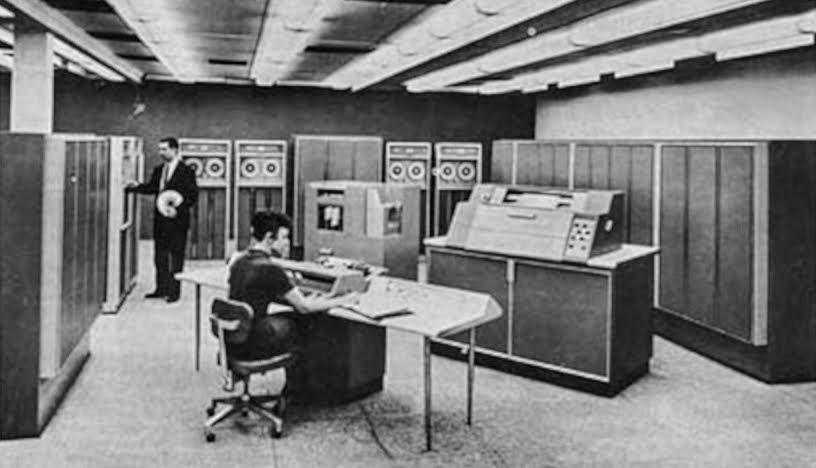
- Honeywell 800 system
- Manufacturer: Honeywell, Inc.
- Released: 1960
- Units sold: 89

The Datamatic Division of Honeywell announced the H-800 electronic computer in 1958. The first installation occurred in 1960. A total of 89 units were delivered. The H-800 design was part of a family of 48-bit word, three-address instruction format computers that descended from the DATAmatic 1000, which was a joint Honeywell and Raytheon project started in 1955. The 1800 and 1800-II were follow-on designs to the H-800.

== Data ==
The basic unit of data was a word of 48 bits. This could be divided in several ways:

- 8 alphanumeric characters of 6 bits each
- 12 hexadecimal or decimal characters of 4 bits each
- 16 octal characters of 3 bits each
- An instruction with four components of 12 bits each: the operation to be performed, and three memory addresses.

== Hardware ==
The Honeywell 800 was a transistorized computer with magnetic-core memory. Its processor used around 6000 discrete transistors and around 30,000 solid-state diodes. The basic system had:

- A Central Processor with 16 controlled input/output trunks
- An Input/Output Control Center (IOCC) with control functions for:
  - A card reader/punch,
  - A high-speed printer
  - Up to four magnetic-tape units
- A control memory of 256 special registers of 16 bits each
- A main memory containing four banks of 2048 words.

Extra peripherals could be added running through additional controllers with a theoretical possibility of 56 tape units.

Up to 12 more main memory banks could be added.

A random-access disc system with a capacity of 800 million alphanumeric characters could be added.

Multiprogram control allowed up to eight programs to be sharing the machine, each with its own set of 32 special registers.

A Floating-Point Unit was optionally available. The 48-bit word allowed a seven-bit exponent and 40-bit mantissa. So numbers between 10^{−78} and 10^{+76} were possible and precision was 12 decimal places. If the floating point unit was not installed, the floating-point commands were implemented by software simulation.

Peripheral devices included: high-density magnetic tapes, high-speed line printers, fast card and paper tape readers and punches to high-capacity random access magnetic disc memories, optical scanners, self-correcting orthoscanners and data communications devices.

== Software ==
Available software included:

- ARGUS (Automatic Routine Generating and Updating System), an assembly language.
- FACT (Fully Autom]]atic Compiling Technique), a business compiler.
- PERT (Program Evaluation and Review Technique), a project management system.
- COP (Computer Optimization Package), a program testing system.
- COBOL (COmmon Business Oriented Language), a compiler for the well known business programming language.
- FORTRAN (FORmula TRANslator), a compiler, runtime package, and "load and go" OS for the scientific language compiler.
