= Musselburgh and Fisherrow Co-operative Society =

- Type: Former consumer co-operative
- Industry: Retail, Leisure, Real estate, Funerals
- Founded: March 27, 1862
- Headquarters: Musselburgh, Scotland, UK
- Area served: Musselburgh and Dalkeith
- Key people: Tom Lees, Chief Executive; Jean Whitehead, President
- Members: 1080 (2005)
- Website: www.mfco-op.co.uk (Internet Archive, 2006)

Musselburgh and Fisherrow Co-operative Society Limited (M&F Co-op) was a retail consumer co-operative trading in the Scottish towns of Musselburgh and Dalkeith. It was founded as a co-operative in 1862, and, in 2007, joined the small number of UK co-operative retailers to demutualise.

In the years immediately prior to demutualising, M&F Co-op ran a funeral business, a food shop and department store in Musselburgh, and also invested in commercial property, including shops and a leisure complex at Fisherrow harbour. It converted into a private company limited by shares called M & F (Scotland) Limited.

== Demutualisation ==
M&F Co-op made headlines as one of a very few retail members of the British co-operative movement to demutualise.

=== 2005 demutualisation attempt ===
Demutualisation of UK co-operatives

Demutualisation of a co-operative is sometimes known as conversion or privatization, and involves the consumer members surrendering their “one member one vote” democratic control of the business, in exchange for a windfall of cash, or shares of a joint stock company.

The stock company acquires control of the business, and ownership of its assets. The most notable demutualization plan of a UK retail co-operative was the 1997 failed hostile takeover bid for the Co-operative Wholesale Society by Andrew Regan.

A number of the UK's agricultural supply co-operatives that engage in retailing demutualized successfully in the late 20th century.

A 2005 attempt by M&F Co-op to demutualise was halted by a Court of Session interdict, and resulted in an investigation by the Financial Services Authority (FSA), the regulator for Industrial and Provident Societies such as M&F Co-op. The petition for interdict, which was made by eight members opposing demutualisation, including former president George Cunningham, alleged 19 governance irregularities, including conflicts of interest and an inquorate board of directors, as three of the six directors had resigned in preceding weeks. The FSA investigation reported in 2006 that M&F Co-op's democratic governance had not been functioning effectively.

=== 2007 demutualization ===
The board called a further members meeting for June 2007 to vote on a demutualization resolution. In September 2007, the M&F Co-op incorporated a private limited company, M & F (Scotland) Limited, and transferred its assets and obligations to it, deregistering as an Industrial and Provident Society on 1 October 2007.

Co-operative News reported that M&F Co-op had technically demutualised and was no longer eligible for membership of Co-operatives UK, due to its articles granting voting rights on the proportion of shares owned rather than the fundamental co-operative principle of one member one vote.

Musselburgh is a coastal town, 6 miles (10 km) from Edinburgh

== Operations ==
M&F Co-op operated a food store and a non-food department store in Musselburgh High Street, a commercial property business, and funeral services in Musselburgh and Dalkeith. In January 2006, M&F Co-op had net assets of £6,745,943.

It built and operated the Quayside restaurant and leisure complex overlooking Fisherrow harbour, which opened in 1992. It sold it in 2007 to leisure entrepreneur Charan Gill, who refurbished it and renamed it The Quay. The commercial property business also leased shops.

== Co-operative movement ==
In 2007, it was the smallest retail consumer co-operative in Scotland, by number of shops. Along with the much larger Scotmid, Lothian Borders & Angus, and The Co-operative Group, the movement had five such co-operatives in Scotland. M&F Co-op and Clydebank Co-operative Society were the only two that had not merged into a regional or national co-operative by that time.

In 1993, M&F Co-op's president George Cunningham, (who petitioned the Court of Session for the 2005 interdict that delayed demutualization,) was president of the Co-operative Congress, considered the highest honour in the British co-operative movement.

The Co-operative Group owns and operates a pharmacy in Musselburgh High Street, and an Alldays convenience store in Clayknowes Road, that are not affiliated with M&F Co-op.
