= 48-bit computing =

Computer architecture bit width

In computer architecture, 48-bit integers, memory addresses, or other data units are those that are 48 bits wide. Also, 48-bit central processing unit (CPU) and arithmetic logic unit (ALU) architectures are those that are based on registers, address buses, or data buses of that size.

In computer architecture, 48-bit integers can represent 281,474,976,710,656 (2^{48} or 2.814749767×10^{14}) discrete values. This allows an unsigned binary integer range of 0 through 281,474,976,710,655 (2^{48} − 1) or a signed two's complement range of −140,737,488,355,328 (−2^{47}) through 140,737,488,355,327 (2^{47} − 1). A 48-bit memory address can directly address every byte of 256 terabytes of storage. 48-bit can refer to any other data unit that consumes 48 bits (6 octets) in width. Examples include 48-bit CPU and ALU architectures that are based on registers, address buses, or data buses of that size.

== Word size ==
Computers with 48-bit words include the AN/FSQ-32, CDC 1604/upper-3000 series, BESM-6, Ferranti Atlas, Philco TRANSAC S-2000 and Burroughs Large Systems. (Note: The B5000, B5500 and B5700 took 3 bits in control words and numeric data for use as a tag; alphanumeric data and instruction syllables were stored in the full 48 bits and had no tags.) (Note: The B5900-B8xxx additionally had a 3- or 4-bit type tag.)

The Honeywell DATAmatic 1000, H-800, the MANIAC II, the MANIAC III, the Brookhaven National Laboratory Merlin, the Philco CXPQ, the Ferranti Orion, the Telefunken Rechner TR 440, the ICT 1301, and many other early transistor-based and vacuum tube computers used 48-bit words.

== Addressing ==
The IBM System/38, and the IBM AS/400 in its CISC variants, use 48-bit byte addresses. The minimal implementation of the x86-64 architecture provides 48-bit byte addressing encoded into 64 bits; future versions of the architecture can expand this without breaking properly written applications.

The address size used in logical block addressing was increased to 48 bits with the introduction of ATA-6. The Ext4 file system physically limits the file block count to 48 bits.

The media access control address (MAC address) of a network interface controller uses a 48-bit address space.

== Images ==
In digital images, 48 bits per pixel, or 16 bits per each color channel (red, green and blue), is used for accurate processing. For the human eye, it is almost impossible to see any difference between such an image and a 24-bit image, but the existence of more shades of each of the three primary colors (65,536 as opposed to 256) means that more operations can be performed on the image without risk of noticeable banding or posterization.
