= Demutualization =

Form of privatization

Demutualization is the process by which a customer-owned mutual organization (mutual) or co-operative changes legal form to a joint stock company. It is sometimes called stocking or privatization. As part of the demutualization process, members of a mutual usually receive a "windfall" payout, in the form of shares in the successor company, a cash payment, or a mixture of both. Mutualization or mutualisation is the opposite process, wherein a shareholder-owned company is converted into a mutual organization, typically through takeover by an existing mutual organization. Furthermore, re-mutualization depicts the process of aligning or refreshing the interest and objectives of the members of the mutual society.

The mutual traditionally raises capital from its customer members in order to provide services to them (for example building societies, where members' savings enable the provision of mortgages to members). It redistributes some profits to its members. By contrast, a joint stock company raises capital from its shareholders and other financial sources in order to provide services to its customers, with profits or assets distributed to equity or debt investors. In a mutual organization, therefore, the legal roles of customer and owner are united in one form ("members"), whereas in the joint stock company the roles are distinct. This allows a broader capital base if the customers cannot or will not provide sufficient financing to the organization. However, a joint stock company must also try to maximize the return for its owners instead of only maximizing the return and customer services to its customers. This can lead to a decline in customer service to the extent that customers', management's and shareholders' interests diverge.

A very early example of demutualization were the changes to the structure of the Union Insurance Society of Canton initiated by its secretary N.J. Ede between 1873 and 1882 leading to its re-registration as a limited company having originated as a mutual assurance society for traders in Canton in 1835.

== Types of demutualizations ==
There are three general methods in which an organization might demutualize, full demutualization, sponsored demutualization, and into a mutual holding company (MHC). In any type of demutualization, insurance policies, outstanding loans, etc., are not directly affected by the organization's change of legal form.

- In a full demutualization, the mutual completely converts to a stock company, and passes on its own (newly issued) stock, cash, and/or policy credits to the members or policyholders. No attempt is made to preserve mutuality in any form. However, in a full demutualization of a mutual savings bank, stock is issued to investors in an initial public offering, while the depositors, who theoretically owned the bank before demutualization, do not automatically receive stock and must separately invest. Under United States federal and state regulations, depositors receive first priority to purchase the stock before any other investors.
- A sponsored demutualization is similar; the mutual is fully demutualized and its policyholders or members are compensated. The difference is that the mutuality is essentially bought by a stock corporation. Instead of receiving stock in the formerly mutual company, stock in the new parent company is granted instead.
- A mutual holding company is a hybrid concept, part stock company and part mutual company. Technically, the members still own over 50% of the company as a whole. Because of this, they are generally not significantly compensated for what would otherwise be viewed as loss of property. (This is also why many jurisdictions, including Canada, disallow the formation of MHCs.) The core participants are isolated into a special segment of the company, still viewed as "mutual". The rest is a stock company. This part of the business might be publicly traded, or held as a wholly owned subsidiary until such time that the organization should choose to go public.

Mutual holding companies are not allowed in New York where attempts by mutual insurance to pass permissible legislation failed. Opponents of mutual insurance holding companies referred to the establishment of mutual holding companies in New York as "Legalized Theft".

Some MHC demutualizations have been planned as the first of a two-stage process. The second stage would be full demutualization once the transition pains into MHC status are complete. In other cases, the MHC is the final stage.

Note that some mutual companies, such as Nationwide Mutual Insurance Company and the MassMutual, have owned stock companies listed on a stock exchange. Nationwide bought back its subsidiary stock company in full, on December 31, 2008. These are not MHCs, however; they are simply mutual companies which have majority control over one or more stock companies. Other mutual companies may own some of another company's stock, but as simply an asset, not something they actually control. Finally, many mutual companies, including Nationwide and MassMutual, have wholly owned subsidiaries. The subsidiaries may technically be stock companies, but the mutual owns all the stock. For example, the New York Life Insurance and Annuity Corporation (NYLIAC) is a wholly owned subsidiary of the New York Life Insurance Company (NYLIC). A person may purchase an insurance policy from either company, but only those who own participating policies from NYLIC are mutual members. Other policyholders are customers.

=== Policyholder compensation in insurance conversions ===
In the demutualization of a mutual insurance company, policyholders may surrender membership rights in exchange for financial compensation. These membership rights are distinct from the contractual benefits provided under their insurance policies, and may include voting rights and rights relating to the company's residual assets. The distribution of compensation is determined by the company's conversion plan, which specifies the eligibility of policyholders and the method used to allocate the available consideration.

In the United States, demutualization plans for life insurers commonly distinguish between fixed and variable components of compensation. The fixed component may be distributed equally among eligible policyholders or policies, while the variable component generally reflects the actuarial contribution of particular policies or classes of policies to the insurer's surplus. Actuaries may be responsible for assessing the fairness of these allocations, taking account of both historical contributions and expected future contributions.

Insurance demutualizations are subject to regulatory oversight. The International Association of Insurance Supervisors specifies that supervisory authorities should assess the financial condition of the insurer and the effects of conversion on existing and future policyholders. Approval procedures differ between jurisdictions and may involve policyholder votes, regulatory decisions or judicial approval. Demutualization does not, in itself, permit an insurer to unilaterally alter the contractual terms of existing policies.

=== Mutual savings institution conversions ===
The demutualization of a mutual savings bank or savings association differs from the conversion of a mutual insurance company. In the United States, qualifying depositors generally receive priority rights to purchase shares in the converting institution, rather than automatically receiving shares without payment. These rights allow depositors to subscribe for stock at a specified price before shares are offered to other investors.

Federal and state banking regulations restrict the transfer of these subscription rights before the conversion is completed. Such restrictions are intended to prevent outside investors from obtaining shares through arrangements with depositors who hold preferential purchasing rights.

== Reasons for demutualization ==
One of the principal motivations for demutualization is to improve access to capital. Mutual organizations generally face restrictions on raising equity because they do not issue ordinary shares to outside investors. Conversion into a shareholder-owned company can enable an organization to raise funds through stock offerings and other financing arrangements.

Research into the insurance industry has found that capital constraints influence decisions to demutualize. A study by Krupa S. Viswanathan and J. David Cummins found evidence consistent with the hypothesis that insurers convert to stock ownership to overcome financial restrictions. The study identified differences in capital and liquidity characteristics between converting mutual insurers and other insurance companies.

Other motivations include facilitating mergers and acquisitions, supporting business expansion and changing the organization's governance structure. In the financial exchange industry, developments in electronic trading, competition and deregulation contributed to the movement away from traditional member-owned exchanges during the 1990s and 2000s.

== Governance and regulatory considerations ==
Demutualization changes the relationship between an organization and its owners. In a mutual organization, ownership and certain governance rights are associated with membership. Following a full conversion to a stock company, these rights are instead associated with share ownership, and the interests of shareholders may differ from those of customers or other users of the organization's services.

In the case of stock exchanges, demutualization has raised questions about potential conflicts between commercial objectives and regulatory responsibilities. Traditionally, many exchanges operated as member-owned organizations with responsibilities for regulating trading activities. Following conversion to for-profit businesses, exchanges may face competing incentives when enforcing rules against the firms that generate their revenue.

Regulatory responses may include changes to an exchange's supervisory arrangements or restrictions designed to manage conflicts of interest. The appropriate balance between commercial independence and regulatory oversight has therefore become an important consideration in the governance of demutualized exchanges.

== Examples ==
=== Security exchanges ===
The Stockholm Stock Exchange was the first exchange to demutualize in 1993, followed by Helsinki (1995), Copenhagen (1996), Amsterdam (1997), the Australian Exchange (1998) and Toronto, Hong Kong and London Stock Exchanges in 2000. The Chicago Mercantile Exchange became a shareholder-owned public corporation in 2000 through a public offering. "The road to this initial public offering began in June 2000, when Exchange members voted overwhelmingly to transform the then not-for-profit, membership-owned organization into a for-profit, shareholder-owned corporation. On November 13, 2000, CME became the first U.S. exchange or commodities exchange to demutualize into a joint stock corporation." The Chicago Mercantile Exchange had its IPO on December 6, 2002.

The Chicago Board of Trade similarly carried out an IPO in 2005, having previously been "a self-governing, self-regulated Delaware not-for-profit, non-stock corporation that serves individuals and member firms". The Stock Exchange of Hong Kong underwent a similar process of demutualization and was publicly traded.

SIX Group, a global financial service provider based in Switzerland, represents an extra ordinary form of a mutualised organisation. The owners are limited to an exclusive group of service consumers, in particular Swiss and foreign banks. This entails a closer relationship with the customer, since a customer might influence the customer-oriented behavior by the magnitude of its own equity holding of SIX Group – in this category the subsidiary SIX Swiss Exchange AG.

=== Life insurers ===
Over 200 US mutual life insurance companies have demutualized since 1930. At the end of the 20th century and beginning of the 21st century numerous large mutuals such as Prudential, MetLife, John Hancock, Mutual of New York, Manulife, Sun Life, Principal, and Phoenix Mutual decided to demutualize and return to policyowners all the profits they had accumulated as mutual life insurers. Policyowners were awarded cash, stock and policy credits exceeding $100 billion in a wave of demutualizations, which have been regarded by some as very rewarding to the new owners although the effect on customers is not discussed. Others show that the demutualization process is detrimental to customers.

The boards of directors of other mutual companies, which include Northwestern Mutual, Massachusetts Mutual, New York Life, Pacific Life, Penn Mutual, Guardian Life, Minnesota Life, Ohio National Life, National Life Group, Union Central Life, Acacia life, and Ameritas Life decided to either remain mutual or they decided to form mutual insurance holding companies. At the end of 2006 there were fewer than 80 mutual life insurers in the United States. Some of these mutual companies award dividends to their policyowners. For example, Northwestern Mutual expects to pay more than $5 billion in dividends to participating policyowners in 2008. Northwestern Mutual has paid its policyowners more than $65 billion in dividends, since the company was founded 151 years ago. Mass Mutual Financial Group's Web site defines life insurance policy dividends.

=== Agricultural cooperatives ===
Numerous agricultural supply and marketing cooperatives have demutualized. One of the largest, CF Industries, a manufacturer and distributor of fertilizers in the United States, was for 56 years a cooperative federation. CF then demutualized and made an initial public offering of equity stock in 2005.

Another large example is Kerry Co-operative Creameries of Ireland, a milk and meat processor that partially demutualized in 1986 under the so-called Irish model, with the primary business of the co-operative transferred to a publicly traded company Kerry Group and the shareholding split between the co-operative and its farmer members. Since this partial demutualisation, the co-operative has gradually reduced its holding in the Kerry Group in order to fund an extensive redemption scheme of its own co-operative shares held by farmer members.

Murray Goulburn Co-operative and Australia's 2016 dairy crisis is another large example.

=== Building societies ===
A building society is a form of mutual mortgage provision organization that emerged in the UK in the 19th century, for personal savings and home mortgages. For much of the 20th century, building societies had a large share of the retail savings market, and they had their zenith after the deregulation under the Building Societies Act 1986. Following that Act, many of the larger societies, beginning with Abbey National, the second largest, in 1989, and including the Halifax Building Society, the largest, soon converted into joint stock banking companies, some of which were subsequently acquired by other banks. Many societies soon became targets of speculative "carpetbaggers", who opened savings accounts in order to obtain a windfall, in cash or shares, in the event of demutualisation. Most of the remaining societies, such as the Nationwide Building Society, the largest remaining mutual, adopted poison pill clauses in their rules as a defense against carpetbaggers. These took the form of a charitable assignment provision that requires new members to assign any compensation from demutualization to charity.

=== Membership associations ===
The UK motorists' organization, The Automobile Association, demutualized and was purchased by Centrica plc in 1999. The sale was completed in July 2000 for £1.1 billion.

=== Retail consumers' cooperatives ===
As well as the many agricultural supply cooperatives that demutualized, a small number of general retail consumers' cooperatives have demutualized or considered demutualization. In 1997, Andrew Regan launched an unsuccessful hostile takeover bid to demutualize the UK's giant Co-operative Wholesale Society, which, despite its name, was a large retailer in its own right. In 2007, the tiny Scottish retailer, Musselburgh and Fisherrow Co-operative Society, completed most or all of the steps necessary to demutualize. In 2008, a Swiss competition regulator recommended demutualization to Switzerland's leading supermarket chains, Coop and Migros.

=== Retailers' co-operatives ===
Irish grocer-owned retailers' cooperative, ADM Londis, changed its capital structure in 2004 to an unlisted public limited company, allowing its owners to trade its stock privately at market value.

== See also ==
- Carpetbagger (United Kingdom)
- Corporatization
- Financial institution
- Mutual insurance
- Privatization
- Thatcherism

== Notes ==
- John W. Carson, Conflicts of Interest in Self-Regulation
- Andreas M. Fleckner, Stock Exchanges at the Crossroads
