= Fieldata =

Military communication project and ASCII precursor

FIELDATA character encoding
- Military primary (1xxxxxx) code, a representative military supervisory (0xxxxxx) code, UNIVAC graphical code
- Classification: 7-bit or 6-bit basic Latin encoding
- Preceded by: ITA 2
- Succeeded by: US-ASCII

FIELDATA (also written as Fieldata) was a pioneering computer project run by the US Army Signal Corps in the late 1950s that intended to create a single standard (as defined in MIL-STD-188A/B/C) for collecting and distributing battlefield information. In this respect it could be thought of as a generalization of the US Air Force's SAGE system that was being created at about the same time.

Unlike SAGE, FIELDATA was intended to be much larger in scope, allowing information to be gathered from any number of sources and forms. Much of the FIELDATA system was the specifications for the format the data would take, leading to a character set that would be a huge influence on ASCII a few years later. FIELDATA also specified the message formats and even the electrical standards for connecting FIELDATA-standard machines together.

Another part of the FIELDATA project was the design and construction of computers at several different scales, from data-input terminals at one end, to theatre-wide data processing centers at the other. Several FIELDATA-standard computers were built during the lifetime of the project, including the transportable MOBIDIC from Sylvania, and the BASICPAC and LOGICPAC from Philco. Another system, ARTOC, was intended to provide graphical output (in the form of photographic slides), but was never completed.

Because FIELDATA did not specify codes for interconnection and data transmission control, different systems (like "STANDARD FORM", "COMLOGNET Common language code", "SACCOMNET (465L) Control Code") used different control functions. Intercommunication between them was difficult.

FIELDATA is the original character set used internally in UNIVAC computers of the 1100 series, each six-bit character contained in six sequential bits of the 36-bit word of that computer. The direct successor to the UNIVAC 1100 is the Unisys 2200 series computers, which used FIELDATA (although ASCII is now also common with each character encoded in 1/4 of a word, or 9 bits). Because some of the FIELDATA characters are not represented in ASCII, the Unisys 2200 uses '^', '"' and '_' characters for codes 004_{oct}, 076_{oct} and 077_{oct} respectively.

The FIELDATA project ran from 1956 until it was stopped during a reorganization in 1962.

== FIELDATA characters ==
=== Military ===
Tag Bit (1)	Indicator Bits (2)	Detail Bits (4)	Binary Bits (1+6)	Decimal	Octal	Glyph	Name	Comment
Supervisory code (tag bit 0)
0	00	0000	0:000000	0	000		Blank / Idle (IDL)	
0	00	0001	0:000001	1	001		Control Upper Case (CUC)	
0	00	0010	0:000010	2	002		Control Lower Case (CLC)	
0	00	0011	0:000011	3	003		Control Tab (CHT)	
0	00	0100	0:000100	4	004		Control Carriage Return (CCR)	
0	00	0101	0:000101	5	005		Control Space (CSP)	
0	00	0110	0:000110	6	006	a		The first two rows of the supervisory code are not used in all applications, only where "alphabetic supervisory information" is required. COMLOGNET omits them, while SACCOMNET includes additional control characters in place of the supervisory letters.
0	00	0111	0:000111	7	007	b		The first two rows of the supervisory code are not used in all applications, only where "alphabetic supervisory information" is required. COMLOGNET omits them, while SACCOMNET includes additional control characters in place of the supervisory letters.
0	00	1000	0:001000	8	010	c		The first two rows of the supervisory code are not used in all applications, only where "alphabetic supervisory information" is required. COMLOGNET omits them, while SACCOMNET includes additional control characters in place of the supervisory letters.
0	00	1001	0:001001	9	011	d		The first two rows of the supervisory code are not used in all applications, only where "alphabetic supervisory information" is required. COMLOGNET omits them, while SACCOMNET includes additional control characters in place of the supervisory letters.
0	00	1010	0:001010	10	012	e		The first two rows of the supervisory code are not used in all applications, only where "alphabetic supervisory information" is required. COMLOGNET omits them, while SACCOMNET includes additional control characters in place of the supervisory letters.
0	00	1011	0:001011	11	013	f		The first two rows of the supervisory code are not used in all applications, only where "alphabetic supervisory information" is required. COMLOGNET omits them, while SACCOMNET includes additional control characters in place of the supervisory letters.
0	00	1100	0:001100	12	014	g		The first two rows of the supervisory code are not used in all applications, only where "alphabetic supervisory information" is required. COMLOGNET omits them, while SACCOMNET includes additional control characters in place of the supervisory letters.
0	00	1101	0:001101	13	015	h		The first two rows of the supervisory code are not used in all applications, only where "alphabetic supervisory information" is required. COMLOGNET omits them, while SACCOMNET includes additional control characters in place of the supervisory letters.
0	00	1110	0:001110	14	016	i		The first two rows of the supervisory code are not used in all applications, only where "alphabetic supervisory information" is required. COMLOGNET omits them, while SACCOMNET includes additional control characters in place of the supervisory letters.
0	00	1111	0:001111	15	017	j		The first two rows of the supervisory code are not used in all applications, only where "alphabetic supervisory information" is required. COMLOGNET omits them, while SACCOMNET includes additional control characters in place of the supervisory letters.
0	01	0000	0:010000	16	020	k		The first two rows of the supervisory code are not used in all applications, only where "alphabetic supervisory information" is required. COMLOGNET omits them, while SACCOMNET includes additional control characters in place of the supervisory letters.
0	01	0001	0:010001	17	021	l		The first two rows of the supervisory code are not used in all applications, only where "alphabetic supervisory information" is required. COMLOGNET omits them, while SACCOMNET includes additional control characters in place of the supervisory letters.
0	01	0010	0:010010	18	022	m		The first two rows of the supervisory code are not used in all applications, only where "alphabetic supervisory information" is required. COMLOGNET omits them, while SACCOMNET includes additional control characters in place of the supervisory letters.
0	01	0011	0:010011	19	023	n		The first two rows of the supervisory code are not used in all applications, only where "alphabetic supervisory information" is required. COMLOGNET omits them, while SACCOMNET includes additional control characters in place of the supervisory letters.
0	01	0100	0:010100	20	024	o		The first two rows of the supervisory code are not used in all applications, only where "alphabetic supervisory information" is required. COMLOGNET omits them, while SACCOMNET includes additional control characters in place of the supervisory letters.
0	01	0101	0:010101	21	025	p		The first two rows of the supervisory code are not used in all applications, only where "alphabetic supervisory information" is required. COMLOGNET omits them, while SACCOMNET includes additional control characters in place of the supervisory letters.
0	01	0110	0:010110	22	026	q		The first two rows of the supervisory code are not used in all applications, only where "alphabetic supervisory information" is required. COMLOGNET omits them, while SACCOMNET includes additional control characters in place of the supervisory letters.
0	01	0111	0:010111	23	027	r		The first two rows of the supervisory code are not used in all applications, only where "alphabetic supervisory information" is required. COMLOGNET omits them, while SACCOMNET includes additional control characters in place of the supervisory letters.
0	01	1000	0:011000	24	030	s		The first two rows of the supervisory code are not used in all applications, only where "alphabetic supervisory information" is required. COMLOGNET omits them, while SACCOMNET includes additional control characters in place of the supervisory letters.
0	01	1001	0:011001	25	031	t		The first two rows of the supervisory code are not used in all applications, only where "alphabetic supervisory information" is required. COMLOGNET omits them, while SACCOMNET includes additional control characters in place of the supervisory letters.
0	01	1010	0:011010	26	032	u		The first two rows of the supervisory code are not used in all applications, only where "alphabetic supervisory information" is required. COMLOGNET omits them, while SACCOMNET includes additional control characters in place of the supervisory letters.
0	01	1011	0:011011	27	033	v		The first two rows of the supervisory code are not used in all applications, only where "alphabetic supervisory information" is required. COMLOGNET omits them, while SACCOMNET includes additional control characters in place of the supervisory letters.
0	01	1100	0:011100	28	034	w		The first two rows of the supervisory code are not used in all applications, only where "alphabetic supervisory information" is required. COMLOGNET omits them, while SACCOMNET includes additional control characters in place of the supervisory letters.
0	01	1101	0:011101	29	035	x		The first two rows of the supervisory code are not used in all applications, only where "alphabetic supervisory information" is required. COMLOGNET omits them, while SACCOMNET includes additional control characters in place of the supervisory letters.
0	01	1110	0:011110	30	036	y		The first two rows of the supervisory code are not used in all applications, only where "alphabetic supervisory information" is required. COMLOGNET omits them, while SACCOMNET includes additional control characters in place of the supervisory letters.
0	01	1111	0:011111	31	037	z		The first two rows of the supervisory code are not used in all applications, only where "alphabetic supervisory information" is required. COMLOGNET omits them, while SACCOMNET includes additional control characters in place of the supervisory letters.
0	10	0000	0:100000	32	040	β	Dial 0 (D0)	Graphical in COMLOGNET variant.
0	10	0001	0:100001	33	041	#	Dial 1 (D1)	Graphical in COMLOGNET variant.
0	10	0010	0:100010	34	042	t	Dial 2 (D2)	Graphical in COMLOGNET variant.
0	10	0011	0:100011	35	043		Dial 3 (D3)	
0	10	0100	0:100100	36	044		Dial 4 (D4)	
0	10	0101	0:100101	37	045	@	Dial 5 (D5)	Graphical in COMLOGNET variant.
0	10	0110	0:100110	38	046	%	Dial 6 (D6)	Graphical in COMLOGNET variant.
0	10	0111	0:100111	39	047	¢	Dial 7 (D7)	Graphical in COMLOGNET variant.
0	10	1000	0:101000	40	050		Dial 8 (D8)	BEL in COMLOGNET.
0	10	1001	0:101001	41	051	&	Dial 9 (D9)	Graphical in COMLOGNET variant.
0	10	1010	0:101010	42	052	Σ	Start of Control Block (SCB, SOC)	Graphical in COMLOGNET variant.
0	10	1011	0:101011	43	053	≠	Start of Block (SBK, SOB)	Graphical in COMLOGNET variant.
0	10	1100	0:101100	44	054	≢	Spare, SOD	Graphical in COMLOGNET variant.
0	10	1101	0:101101	45	055	°	Spare	Graphical in COMLOGNET variant.
0	10	1110	0:101110	46	056		Spare	
0	10	1111	0:101111	47	057		Spare, Stop	
0	11	0000	0:110000	48	060		Ready to Transmit (RTT)	
0	11	0001	0:110001	49	061		Ready to Receive (RTR)	
0	11	0010	0:110010	50	062		Not Ready to Receive (NRR)	
0	11	0011	0:110011	51	063		End of Blockette (EBE, EOBK)	
0	11	0100	0:110100	52	064		End of Block (EBK, EOB)	
0	11	0101	0:110101	53	065		End of File (EOF)	
0	11	0110	0:110110	54	066		End of Control Block (ECB, EOC)	
0	11	0111	0:110111	55	067		Acknowledge Receipt (ACK, ACR)	
0	11	1000	0:111000	56	070		Repeat Block (RPT, RBK)	
0	11	1001	0:111001	57	071		Spare	Ordered ISN, NISN, CWF, Spare in some variants.
0	11	1010	0:111010	58	072		Interpret Sign (INS, ISN)	Ordered ISN, NISN, CWF, Spare in some variants.
0	11	1011	0:111011	59	073		Non-Interpret Sign (NIS, NISN)	Ordered ISN, NISN, CWF, Spare in some variants.
0	11	1100	0:111100	60	074		Control Word Follows (CWF)	Ordered ISN, NISN, CWF, Spare in some variants.
0	11	1101	0:111101	61	075		S.A.C. (SAC)	
0	11	1110	0:111110	62	076		Special Character (SPC)	ASCII ESC.
0	11	1111	0:111111	63	077		Delete (DEL)	
Primary code (tag bit 1)
1	00	0000	1:000000	64	100		Master Space (MS)	
1	00	0001	1:000001	65	101		Upper Case (UC)	
1	00	0010	1:000010	66	102		Lower Case (LC)	
1	00	0011	1:000011	67	103		Tab (HT)	
1	00	0100	1:000100	68	104		Carriage Return (CR)	
1	00	0101	1:000101	69	105		Blank / Space (SP)	
1	00	0110	1:000110	70	106	A		
1	00	0111	1:000111	71	107	B		
1	00	1000	1:001000	72	110	C		
1	00	1001	1:001001	73	111	D		
1	00	1010	1:001010	74	112	E		
1	00	1011	1:001011	75	113	F		
1	00	1100	1:001100	76	114	G		
1	00	1101	1:001101	77	115	H		
1	00	1110	1:001110	78	116	I		
1	00	1111	1:001111	79	117	J		
1	01	0000	1:010000	80	120	K		
1	01	0001	1:010001	81	121	L		
1	01	0010	1:010010	82	122	M		
1	01	0011	1:010011	83	123	N		
1	01	0100	1:010100	84	124	O		
1	01	0101	1:010101	85	125	P		
1	01	0110	1:010110	86	126	Q		
1	01	0111	1:010111	87	127	R		
1	01	1000	1:011000	88	130	S		
1	01	1001	1:011001	89	131	T		
1	01	1010	1:011010	90	132	U		
1	01	1011	1:011011	91	133	V		
1	01	1100	1:011100	92	134	W		
1	01	1101	1:011101	93	135	X		
1	01	1110	1:011110	94	136	Y		
1	01	1111	1:011111	95	137	Z		
1	10	0000	1:100000	96	140	)		
1	10	0001	1:100001	97	141	-		
1	10	0010	1:100010	98	142	+		
1	10	0011	1:100011	99	143	<		
1	10	0100	1:100100	100	144	=		
1	10	0101	1:100101	101	145	>		
1	10	0110	1:100110	102	146	_		& in UNIVAC.
1	10	0111	1:100111	103	147	$		
1	10	1000	1:101000	104	150	*		
1	10	1001	1:101001	105	151	(		
1	10	1010	1:101010	106	152	"		% in UNIVAC.
1	10	1011	1:101011	107	153	:		
1	10	1100	1:101100	108	154	?		
1	10	1101	1:101101	109	155	!		
1	10	1110	1:101110	110	156	,		
1	10	1111	1:101111	111	157		Stop (ST)	
1	11	0000	1:110000	112	160	0		
1	11	0001	1:110001	113	161	1		
1	11	0010	1:110010	114	162	2		
1	11	0011	1:110011	115	163	3		
1	11	0100	1:110100	116	164	4		
1	11	0101	1:110101	117	165	5		
1	11	0110	1:110110	118	166	6		
1	11	0111	1:110111	119	167	7		
1	11	1000	1:111000	120	170	8		
1	11	1001	1:111001	121	171	9		
1	11	1010	1:111010	122	172	'		
1	11	1011	1:111011	123	173	;		
1	11	1100	1:111100	124	174	/		
1	11	1101	1:111101	125	175	.		
1	11	1110	1:111110	126	176		Special Character (SPEC)	
1	11	1111	1:111111	127	177		Backspace (BS)	

=== UNIVAC ===
The code version used on the UNIVAC was based on the second half (primary code) of the military version with some changes.

Indicator Bits (2)	Detail Bits (4)	Binary Bits (6)	Decimal	Octal	Glyph	Name	Comments
00	0000	000000	0	00	@		Sometimes switched with Δ
00	0001	000001	1	01	[		
00	0010	000010	2	02	]		
00	0011	000011	3	03	#		Line Feed (LF) on 1107 and 1108
00	0100	000100	4	04	Δ	Delta	Carriage Return (CR) on 1107 and 1108
00	0101	000101	5	05		Blank / Space (SP)	
00	0110	000110	6	06	A		
00	0111	000111	7	07	B		
00	1000	001000	8	10	C		
00	1001	001001	9	11	D		
00	1010	001010	10	12	E		
00	1011	001011	11	13	F		
00	1100	001100	12	14	G		
00	1101	001101	13	15	H		
00	1110	001110	14	16	I		
00	1111	001111	15	17	J		
01	0000	010000	16	20	K		
01	0001	010001	17	21	L		
01	0010	010010	18	22	M		
01	0011	010011	19	23	N		
01	0100	010100	20	24	O		
01	0101	010101	21	25	P		
01	0110	010110	22	26	Q		
01	0111	010111	23	27	R		
01	1000	011000	24	30	S		
01	1001	011001	25	31	T		
01	1010	011010	26	32	U		
01	1011	011011	27	33	V		
01	1100	011100	28	34	W		
01	1101	011101	29	35	X		
01	1110	011110	30	36	Y		
01	1111	011111	31	37	Z		
10	0000	100000	32	40	)		
10	0001	100001	33	41	-		
10	0010	100010	34	42	+		
10	0011	100011	35	43	<		
10	0100	100100	36	44	=		
10	0101	100101	37	45	>		
10	0110	100110	38	46	&		Changed from _ in military version.
10	0111	100111	39	47	$		
10	1000	101000	40	50	*		
10	1001	101001	41	51	(		
10	1010	101010	42	52	%		Changed from " in military version.
10	1011	101011	43	53	:		
10	1100	101100	44	54	?		
10	1101	101101	45	55	!		
10	1110	101110	46	56	,		
10	1111	101111	47	57	\		Stop sign (🛑︎) on 1107 and 1108
11	0000	110000	48	60	0		
11	0001	110001	49	61	1		
11	0010	110010	50	62	2		
11	0011	110011	51	63	3		
11	0100	110100	52	64	4		
11	0101	110101	53	65	5		
11	0110	110110	54	66	6		
11	0111	110111	55	67	7		
11	1000	111000	56	70	8		
11	1001	111001	57	71	9		
11	1010	111010	58	72	'		
11	1011	111011	59	73	;		
11	1100	111100	60	74	/		
11	1101	111101	61	75	.		
11	1110	111110	62	76	⌑	Lozenge	
11	1111	111111	63	77	≠	Not Equal	Idle character (IDLE) on some models

== Character map ==
=== Military version ===
The following table is representative of a reference version of the military set, as described in Leubbert (1960b). Various other variants exist, with in some cases dramatic differences in the supervisory code (the first four rows 0–3). The letters in the first two rows are intended for use in "alphabetic supervisory information".

FIELDATA (military)
	0	1	2	3	4	5	6	7	8	9	A	B	C	D	E	F
0x	IDL	CUC	CLC	CHT	CCR	CSP	a 0061	b 0062	c 0063	d 0064	e 0065	f 0066	g 0067	h 0068	i 0069	j 006A
1x	k 006B	l 006C	m 006D	n 006E	o 006F	p 0070	q 0071	r 0072	s 0073	t 0074	u 0075	v 0076	w 0077	x 0078	y 0079	z 007A
2x	D0	D1	D2	D3	D4	D5	D6	D7	D8	D9	SCB	SBK				
3x	RTT	RTR	NRR	EBE	EBK	EOF	ECB	ACK	RPT		INS	NIS	CWF	SAC	SPC	DEL
4x	MS	UC	LC	HT	CR	SP	A 0041	B 0042	C 0043	D 0044	E 0045	F 0046	G 0047	H 0048	I 0049	J 004A
5x	K 004B	L 004C	M 004D	N 004E	O 004F	P 0050	Q 0051	R 0052	S 0053	T 0054	U 0055	V 0056	W 0057	X 0058	Y 0059	Z 005A
6x	) 0029	- 002D	+ 002B	< 003C	= 003D	> 003E	_ 005F	$ 0024	* 002A	( 0028	" 0022	: 003A	? 003F	! 0021	, 002C	STOP
7x	0 0030	1 0031	2 0032	3 0033	4 0034	5 0035	6 0036	7 0037	8 0038	9 0039	' 0027	; 003B	/ 002F	. 002E	SPEC	BS

=== UNIVAC version ===
The code version used on the UNIVAC was based on the second half (6-bit primary code) of the military version with some changes.

FIELDATA (UNIVAC)
	0	1	2	3	4	5	6	7	8	9	A	B	C	D	E	F
0x	@ 0040	[ 005B	] 005D	#/LF	Δ/CR	SP	A 0041	B 0042	C 0043	D 0044	E 0045	F 0046	G 0047	H 0048	I 0049	J 004A
1x	K 004B	L 004C	M 004D	N 004E	O 004F	P 0050	Q 0051	R 0052	S 0053	T 0054	U 0055	V 0056	W 0057	X 0058	Y 0059	Z 005A
2x	) 0029	- 002D	+ 002B	< 003C	= 003D	> 003E	& 0026	$ 0024	* 002A	( 0028	% 0025	: 003A	? 003F	! 0021	, 002C	\/🛑︎ 005C
3x	0 0030	1 0031	2 0032	3 0033	4 0034	5 0035	6 0036	7 0037	8 0038	9 0039	' 0027	; 003B	/ 002F	. 002E	⌑ 2311	≠/IDL

== References and further reading ==
- Fleming, George; James, Nathan L. (2002-12-17). "Univac Fieldata Codes". 1.0. Greenbelt, USA: National Space Science Data Center (NSSDC), NASA Goddard Space Flight Center. Archived from the original on 2016-05-24.
- Haralambous, Yannis (September 2007). Fonts & Encodings. Translated by Horne, P. Scott (1st ed.). Sebastopol, California, USA: O'Reilly Media, Inc. p. 29. ISBN 978-0-596-10242-5.
- Jennings, Thomas Daniel (2020-03-17) [1999]. "An annotated history of some character codes or ASCII: American Standard Code for Information Infiltration". Sensitive research (SR-IX).
- Leubbert, William F. (1960a) [1959-12-01/03 (International Workshop on Managing Requirements Knowledge)]. Written at U.S. Army Signal Research and Development Laboratory, Fort Monmouth, New Jersey, USA. Data Transmission Equipment Concepts for FIELDATA (PDF). 1959 Proceedings of the Western Joint Computer Conference (WJCC). Boston, USA: American Federation of Information Processing Societies (AFIPS). pp. 189–196. doi:10.1109/AFIPS.1959.27. Archived (PDF) from the original on 2016-05-23.
- Leubbert, William F. (September 1960b). "Data Processing as a Tool for Generalizing Communications Systems". Transactions of the American Institute of Electrical Engineers, Part I: Communication and Electronics. 79 (4): 431–436. Bibcode:1960TAICE..79..431L. doi:10.1109/TCE.1960.6367290. S2CID 51649324.
- Mackenzie, Charles E. (1980). Coded Character Sets, History and Development (PDF). The Systems Programming Series (1 ed.). Addison-Wesley Publishing Company, Inc. pp. 61, 64, 86. ISBN 978-0-201-14460-4. LCCN 77-90165. Archived (PDF) from the original on May 26, 2016.
- Walker, John (1996-08-06). "UNIVAC 1100 Series FIELDATA Code". UNIVAC Memories. Archived from the original on 2016-05-22.
