= Thomas W. Moore =

American television executive (1918-2007)

Thomas Waldrop Moore (September 17, 1918 – March 31, 2007) was an American television executive who headed ABC in the 1960s.

== Biography ==
Moore was born in Meridian, Mississippi. He attended Mississippi State University and graduated from University of Missouri. During World War II, he served as a pilot in the United States Navy . After the war, he worked as spokesman for Forest Lawn Memorial-Parks & Mortuaries in Los Angeles. In 1947, he started selling airtime for CBS Radio before and was later hired by ABC as vice president of sales in 1956.

He was ABC's vice president of programming from 1956 to 1957, then network president from 1957 to 1969.

Among the shows aired during this time were The Real McCoys, 77 Sunset Strip, My Three Sons, The Flintstones, Ben Casey, and The Untouchables. While he was network president, the network added, among other shows, McHale's Navy, Peyton Place, The Addams Family and Batman.

Moore had a rising Howard Cosell removed from ABC television on-air work in 1959 because he didn't like him. Cosell's removal was rumored to be linked to anti-Semitism, but Cosell himself never directly ascribed to that explanation.

He left ABC to become chairman of Ticketron, a computerized event ticketing company. In December 1970, he resigned from Ticketron to become president of Tomorrow Entertainment, a newly formed subsidiary and production company of General Electric. The shows produced by Tomorrow Entertainment were nominated for ten Emmy Awards, winning at least five.

Business positions
Preceded by James T. Aubrey	Vice President, Programs ABC; 1958–1963	Succeeded by Edgar Scherick
