= Computer Applications, Inc. =

American software company (1960–1970)

Computer Applications, Inc. (CAI) was an American computer software company of the 1960s. Founded in 1960 in New York City, it grew to encompass contract programming, computer services, and various subsidiary businesses. By the end of the decade, it was the second largest independent software company in the United States. Falling into a rapid decline, it went bankrupt in 1970.

== Origin and growth ==
Computer Applications, Inc. was founded in 1960 and its headquarters were located in New York City. The company was part of a group of software contracting start-up companies that sprung up in the late 1950s and early 1960s. It had an initial offering of shares in 1962. The company soon had additional offices in San Diego, California, and Washington, D.C.

In 1963 they acquired Electronic Business Services Corporation, which helped them get into the service bureau business. Eventually they would have the most services bureaus of any computer firm on the East Coast of the United States. A number of other subsidiaries would be part of the company as well, including two located in Silver Spring, Maryland, and one in Fairfield, New Jersey.

The company was involved not just in programming jobs for businesses but also for computer manufacturers. An instance of the latter was a contract the company had to develop the Indexed Sequential Access Method (ISAM) for the IBM OS/360 mainframe platform. The company also operated computer center activities for parts of the federal government; this included three computer centers within NASA. Another consequential project they were involved in was building parts of what became the Ticketron computerized event ticketing system.

Following a couple of profitable years, in 1965 the company's stock was listed on the American Stock Exchange under the symbol CPD.

== Prominence ==
Of those other computer software firms that started up around the same time, only a few others grew to be large as Computer Applications; they included Computer Sciences Corporation (CSC), Computer Usage Company (CUC), and C-E-I-R. Eventually CAI became one of the "big five" software contracting houses in the United States, with the others being CSC, CUC, System Development Corporation, and Planning Research Corporation.

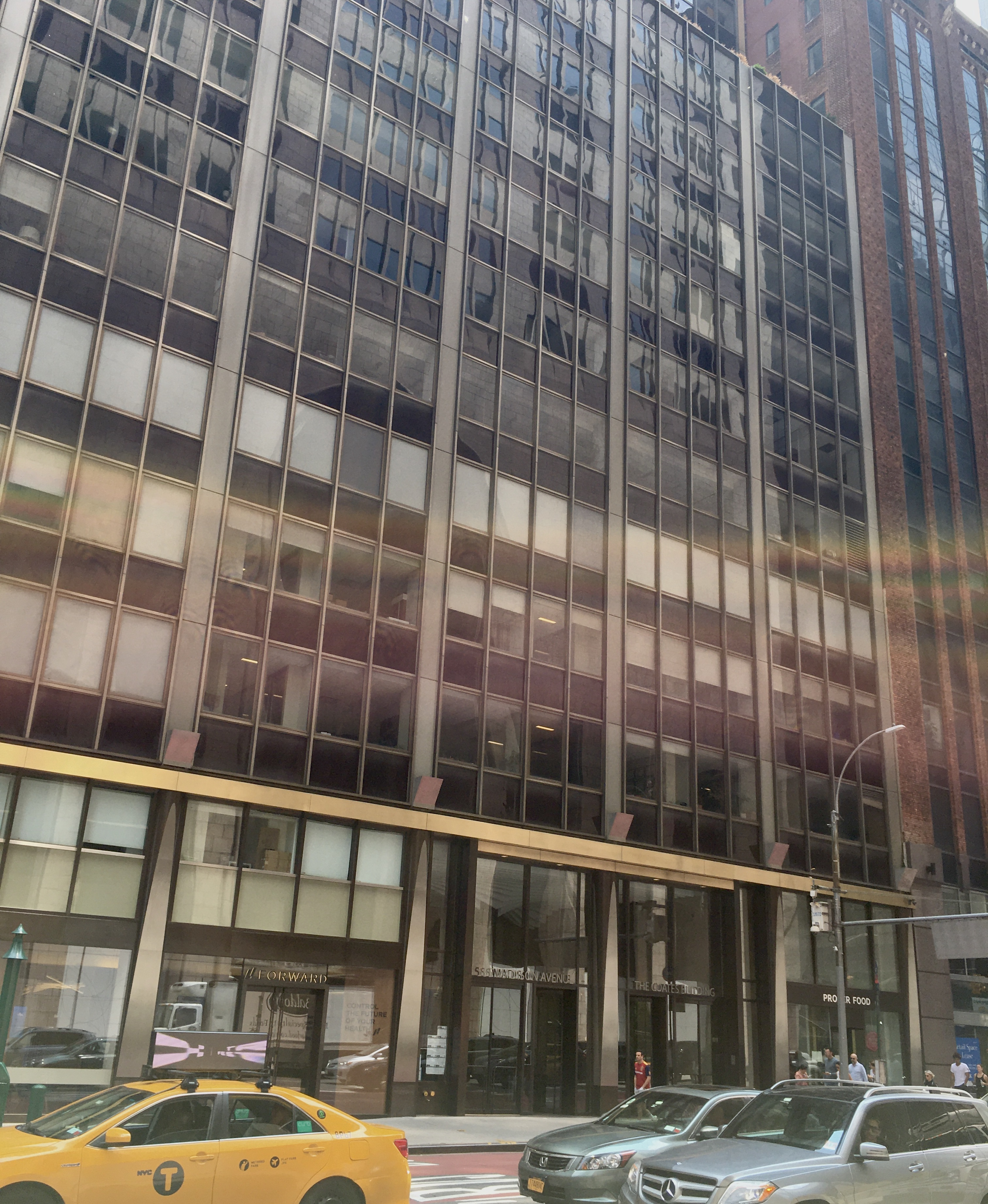
Computer Applications, Inc. had its offices at 555 Madison Avenue in New York City (here seen in 2023).

The company's New York Office was located at 555 Madison Avenue. Also in the same midtown Manhattan building was a competitor of sorts, Advanced Computer Techniques, and at a time when finding programming talent was an exercise in creativity, that company's executives poached several Computer Applications programmers whom they happened to see riding the elevators holding a deck of punched cards. Another company Computer Applications competed against in the programming services area was Applied Data Research (before that company became better known for its software products).

By 1967, Computer Applications, Inc. had around 2,100 employees. It consisted of a parent company and nine subsidiaries, a number that would vary somewhat over time. There eight different service bureaus, as well as offices in eleven different cities. One of those was in Sacramento, California. A third of its revenues were from the government realm.

In this era the valuations of software and computer services companies increased greatly, in what later came to be seen as a speculative bubble. The share price of Computer Applications, Inc. rose to an all-time high of 47 3/8 in 1967.

As of 1968, Computer Applications, Inc. was still making a profit. By the end of the decade, it was the second-largest independent software firm in the United States, behind only CSC. Its customers included government – federal, state, and local – as well as commercial enterprises. Besides being a computer services provider, it also had units that were engaged in market research; direct mail; and book distribution activities.

== End ==
The fairly mild recession of 1969–1970 in the United States was associated with a steeper downturn within the computer industry. CAI was one of several large software companies in the late 1960s that made significant investments into offering teleprocessing services and the so-called "Computer Utility", meaning remotely hosted hardware and software on which customers could run their applications; however, the market for the computer utility never materialized at that time.

The company's immediate ruin was in the Speedata project, which was intended to provide inventory control for warehouses belonging to grocery stores. Speedata had cost over $10 million and several years to develop and then was completely abandoned in April 1970 when the company could not raise $5 million more to finish it. The head of the company, John A. DeVries, resigned the following month and was replaced by one of the founders, Joseph A. Delario.

While other companies failed during this period, Computer Applications' demise was especially rapid. In October 1970, the company petitioned the U.S. bankruptcy courts to be able to file a reorganization plan. By the time of the filing, the company's stock was down to 3 5/8, a long fall from its one-time peak of 47 3/8. The reorganization request was denied, and with liabilities essentially double those of its assets and its bank accounts seized by a creditor, Computer Applications, Inc. could not continue. As the company was insolvent, it was placed into a receivership, for the purposes of liquidation.

In many respects, Computer Applications, Inc. would be little remembered; as per computer science historian Martin Campbell-Kelly, writing in 2003, "its history has largely been lost".
