= Roy Nutt =

American computer pioneer and businessman (1930–1990)

- Born: October 20, 1930; Marlborough, Massachusetts, US
- Died: June 14, 1990 (age 59); Seattle, Washington
- Occupation(s): Businessman: Computer software

Roy Nutt (October 20, 1930 – June 14, 1990) was an American businessman and computer pioneer. He was a co-creator of Fortran and co-founded Computer Sciences Corporation.

== Fortran ==
Born in Marlborough, Massachusetts, Roy Nutt grew up in Glastonbury, Connecticut. He graduated in 1953 with a bachelor's degree in mathematics from Trinity College in Hartford.

A pioneer in the fledgling software industry of the 1950s, Roy Nutt was a major contributor in the creation of IBM's FORTRAN, the first high-level scientific and engineering programming language. Part of the FORTRAN project's team, he was responsible for developing the computer command FORMAT, which controls data for input and output.

Nutt also created an assembler for the IBM 704 mainframe that is today seen as the most successful individual programming effort of the 1950s.

== SHARE ==
During this period, Roy Nutt met Fletcher Jones when he joined with nineteen others from the aerospace industry to form the influential IBM user group known as SHARE which developed SOS, one of the first operating systems. Jones, as secretary of the group, became its national spokesman and their working relationship would later result in a business partnership.

== CSC ==
Roy Nutt had become a widely respected computer programmer for United Aircraft Corp. in East Hartford, Connecticut, where he developed the Symbolic Assembly Program for the IBM 704. He left in 1959 to team up with Fletcher Jones to establish Computer Sciences Corporation (CSC) in Los Angeles.

Jones, who ran the business and marketing end of things, obtained a contract from Honeywell that gave their business profitability and respect within the industry. Nutt was responsible for building Honeywell the first commercial compiler (FACT) and oversaw the company's major 1961 entry into the space industry when they obtained a contract to support the NASA Jet Propulsion Laboratory's Flight Operations Facility.

Within four years of its founding, CSC became the largest software company in the United States. Taking their business Public company with an IPO listed on the American Stock Exchange. By the end of the 1960s, CSC was listed on the New York Stock Exchange and had operations in Canada, the United Kingdom, (Germany), Italy, and in The Netherlands.

== Later years ==
In later years, Roy Nutt used some of his wealth to benefit Trinity College. He set up an endowment fund for a professorship and donated money to assist in the construction of the college's engineering and computing building. Trinity College honored him in May 2012 when they renamed the building the Roy Nutt Mathematics, Engineering & Computer Science Center.

Roy Nutt died of lung cancer in Seattle, Washington on June 14, 1990.
