= Computer Sciences Corporation =

Defunct American corporation that provided information technology services

- Type: Public
- Traded as: NYSE: CSC
- Industry: IT services, IT consulting
- Founded: April 1959; 67 years ago
- Founder: Roy Nutt; Fletcher R. Jones
- Defunct: April 3, 2017
- Fate: Merged with HP Enterprise Services; formed DXC Technology
- Successor: DXC Technology
- Headquarters: Tysons, Virginia, United States
- Area served: Worldwide
- Key people: John Michael Lawrie (Chairman, President and CEO)
- Services: IT, business consulting and outsourcing services
- Subsidiaries: Computer Sciences Raytheon, Xchanging

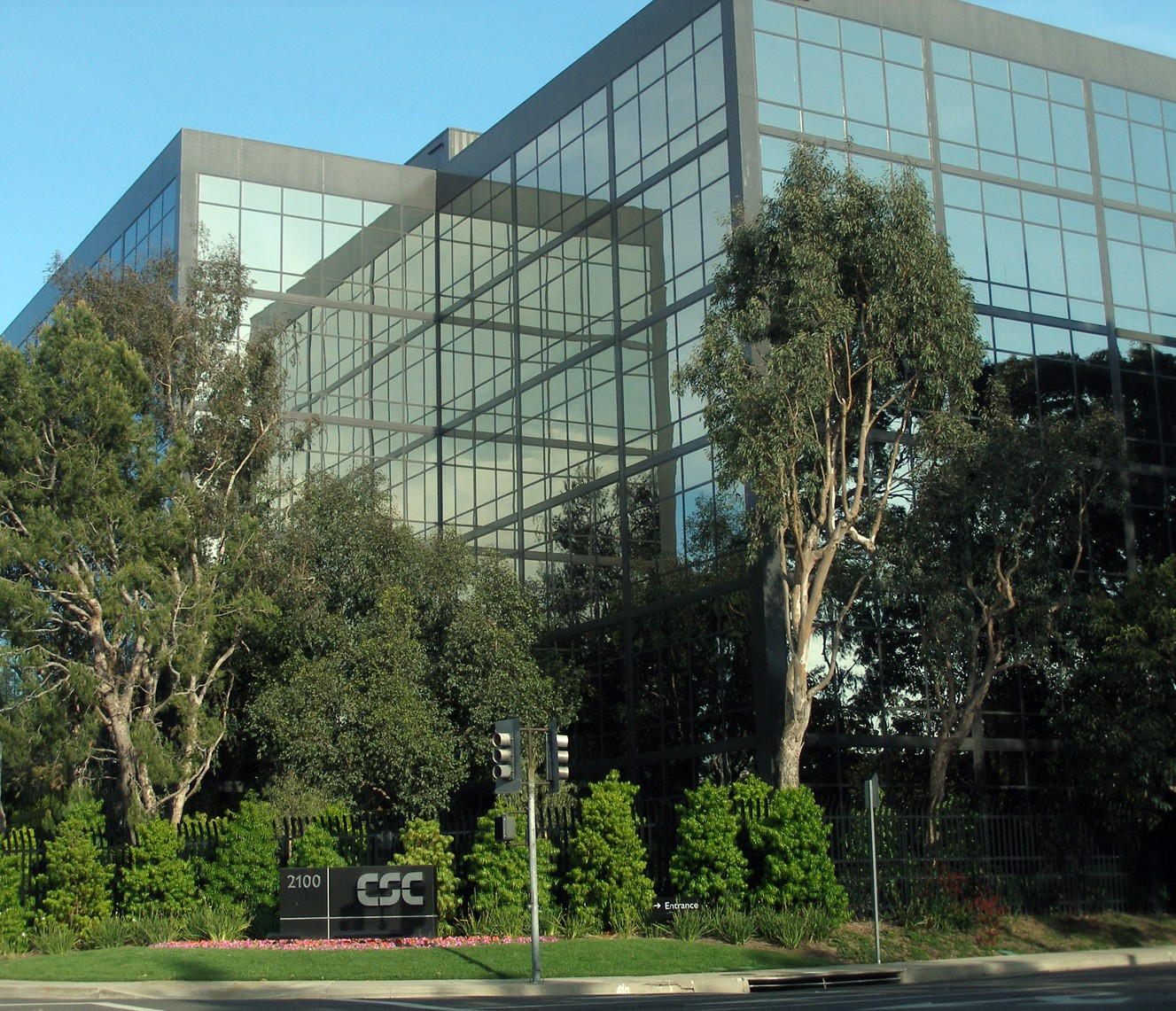
CSC's former headquarters in El Segundo, California (branch office after 2008)

Computer Sciences Corporation (CSC) was an American multinational corporation that provided information technology (IT) services and professional services. Founded in Los Angeles in 1959, the company gained system software contract work with computer manufacturers, electronics manufacturers, and in the U.S. defense and government sectors, and became the most successful of all the 1950s computer services startup companies. Within four years, it had become the largest software company in the United States and the first to be listed on the American Stock Exchange. The company continued to grow in size and influence and during the 1970s was considered the industry giant in its segment. By 2009 it was the largest non-manufacturing IT services provider in the world.

Towards the end of 2015, the government services business of CSC was split off, and merged with SRA International, to form a new company, CSRA. Then on April 3, 2017, the remaining commercial and international business of CSC merged with the Enterprise Services line of business of HP Enterprise (formerly Electronic Data Systems) to create DXC Technology.

== History ==
Computer Sciences Corporation was founded in April 1959 in Los Angeles, California, by Roy Nutt and Fletcher Jones. Nutt was a highly skilled computer programmer with United Aircraft Corporation while Jones was a middle manager at North American Aviation. The company had three employees to start with, with third being a veteran of another early software contracting house, C-E-I-R.

CSC initially provided programming tools such as assembler and compiler software. Indeed, a contract with Minneapolis-Honeywell, was how the company began its existence; the work was to produce a compiler for the English language-oriented FACT computer language. Early on, CSC achieved visibility in the computer industry; by September 1959, Jones was chairing a session at the national conference of the Association for Computing Machinery (ACM) on the latest offerings for automatic programming. While FACT would lose out to COBOL in becoming the basis for a widely used business-oriented programming language, it did influence several of the early revisions to COBOL.

After that, CSC provided software programming services to major computer manufacturers like UNIVAC with the Sperry Rand Corporation, the Burroughs Corporation, and IBM. Also an early customer was Douglas Aircraft Company, as were the electronics manufacturers Philco, RCA Corporation, and, in Europe, Philips N.V.

By August 1960, the firm already had 25 employees, and moved its headquarters from Inglewood to two floors of a building in Palos Verdes Estates (staying within the Los Angeles County, California area). Then in early 1963 they moved into three floors of a building in El Segundo, California, with office space designed by Welton Becket and Associates. The company would remain headquartered in El Segundo for the next four decades.

CSC secured their first contracts for the U.S. public sector with NASA (among others). In the mid-1960s they were named the prime contractor for NASA's finite element analysis program NASTRAN.

There were other large software contracting houses at the time, such as Computer Applications, Inc. and Computer Usage Company, but none rivaled CSC in size or level of success. By 1963, CSC became the largest software company in the United States and the first software company to be listed on the American Stock Exchange. By the end of 1968, CSC was listed on the New York Stock Exchange, and had operations in Canada, India, the United Kingdom, Germany, Spain, Italy, Brazil, and the Netherlands.

However, being public imposed pressures on software houses to achieve faster growth and invest in new ventures. As an instance of this, CSC set up Computicket Corp. to enter in the fledgling electronic ticket market in 1967, competing with Ticketron. But it was easy to underestimate time and cost to develop complex software like this and to overestimate size of market for it, and the recession of 1969–1970 made matters even more difficult. The Computicket effort lost $13 million and CSC discontinued the service in 1970. And it was a difficult time for the software houses of the era: some managed to weather these factors, like Advanced Computer Techniques, while others could not and went bankrupt, like Computer Applications, Inc.

IBM decided to unbundle software from its mainframes in 1969, which helped facilitate the growth of the commercial software industry; in particular, this fueled the growth of independent software packages, such as Mark IV from Informatics, Inc. In response, CSC released its several software packages of its own, including the Mark IV-like Cogent II file management system, the Compuflight II reservation system, and the Exodus software migration utility – but these were already existing programs that CSC had developed as part of customer engagements, and their release did not change CSC's focus as a contracting and services company.

Marine Weather Dissemination Systems Study, prepared by CSC for the U.S. Coast Guard in 1971

By the mid-1970s, Computer Sciences Corporation had become one of the industry leaders in the training and education segment.

By 1979, CSC had some $411 million in annual revenue, from various kinds of services.

In the 1970s and 1980s, CSC expanded globally winning large contracts for the finance and defense industries and through acquisitions in Europe and Australia.

In 1988, CSC acquired James A. Champy and Michael Martin Hammer's consulting business Index, forming the captive CSC Index consulting business.

The European headquarters of Computer Sciences Corporation was consolidated at this former Royal Pavilion site in Aldershot, England in the early 2000s

By 2000, CSC had $9.4 billion in revenue and almost 60,000 employees across some 600 sites worldwide.

In 2000, CSC founded a joint-venture called Innovative Banking Solutions AG in Wiesbaden, Germany, to market their newly developed SAP solution for mortgage companies.

Since its beginnings in 1959, company headquarters had been in California. On March 29, 2008, the corporate headquarters of the company were relocated from El Segundo, California, to Falls Church, Virginia. CSC had been a Fortune 500 Company since 1995, coming in at 162 in the 2012 rankings.

By 2008, CSC had revenues of over $15 billion and 92,000 staff around the globe. In 2009, CSC ranked as the fourth-largest IT services provider in the world, and the largest that was not also a computer manufacturer.

CSC had offices in this building in Dresden, Germany, as seen in 2010

In fiscal 2013, CSC acquired ServiceMesh (cloud management) for $282M, Infochimps (a big data platform) for $27M, 42Six (analytics for national intelligence) for $35 million, iSOFT (application solutions) for cash and debt, and AppLabs (application testing) for $171M.

In May 2015, CSC announced plans to split the public sector business from its commercial and international business. In August, it was announced that CSC's Government Service business would merge with SRA International to form a new company — CSRA—at the end of November 2015.

In July 2015, CSC and HCL Technologies announced the signing of a joint venture agreement to form a banking software and services company, Celeriti FinTech.

In September 2015, CSC closed the acquisition of Fixnetix, a provider of front-office managed trading solutions in capital markets. CSC also acquired Fruition Partners, a provider of technology-enabled solutions for the service-management sector during the month.

In November 2015, CSC agreed to acquire the shares of UXC, an IT services company based in Australia in a deal valued at A$427.6 million (US$309 million).

In December 2015, business technology and services provider, Xchanging, agreed to be purchased by CSC.

In February 2016, CSC announced it was moving its headquarters to Tysons in Fairfax County, Virginia.

On April 3, 2017, it merged with HPE Enterprise Services to create DXC Technology.

== Business ==
Two CSC engineering technicians overlook the decommissioning of the U.S. Navy aircraft carrier USS Oriskany (CVA-34) in 2006

A technician from CSC monitors some flight simulator training for the U.S. Army Black Hawk helicopter in 2013

CSC once ranked among the leading IT service providers in the world. Geographically, CSC had major operations throughout North America, Europe, Asia, and Australia.

The company operated in three broad service lines or sectors until the 2015 divestment of NPS, its public sector:

- North American Public Sector (NPS): Since 1961, CSC had been one of the major IT service providers for the U.S. federal government. CSC provided services to the United States Department of Defense, law enforcement and intelligence agencies (FBI, CIA, Homeland Security), aeronautics and aerospace agencies (NASA). In 2012, U.S. federal contracts accounted for 36% of CSC total revenue.
- Managed Services
- Business Solutions and Services

The company made several acquisitions, including DynCorp in 2003 and Covansys Corporation in 2007.

== Awards and recognition ==
- In September 2012, CSC was ranked 8th in Software Magazine’s Software 500 ranking of the world’s largest software and service providers.

== Criticism ==
- In June 2013, Margaret Hodge, chair of the Public Accounts Committee, a Select committee of the British House of Commons, described CSC as a "rotten company providing a hopeless system" with reference to their multibillion-pound contract to deliver the National Programme for IT Lorenzo contract.
- In December 2011, the non-partisan organization Public Campaign criticized CSC for spending US$4.39 million on lobbying and not paying any taxes during 2008–10, instead getting US$305 million in tax rebates, despite making a profit of US$1.67 billion.
- In February 2011, the U.S. Securities and Exchange Commission (SEC) launched a fraud investigation into CSC's accounting practices in Denmark and Australian business. CSC's CFO Mike Mancuso confirmed that accounting errors and intentional misconduct by certain personnel in Australia prompted SEC regulators to turn their gaze to Australia. Mancuso also stated that the alleged misconduct includes US$19 million in both intentional accounting irregularities and unintentional accounting errors. The SEC accused the former CEO Mike Laphen of fraud and clawed back $4,35 million
- The company was accused of breaching human rights by arranging several illegal rendition flights for the CIA between 2003 and 2006, which also led to criticism of shareholders of the company, including the governments of Norway and Britain.
- The company engaged in a number of activities that resulted in legal actions against it. These are:
  1. Its so-called WorldBridge Service (Visa Services), which processed and issued millions of visa applications to enter Britain, did not involve British authorities.
  2. In 1998, CSC was the prime contractor hired by the Internal Revenue Service to modernize its tax-filing system. They told the IRS it would meet a January 2006 deadline, but failed to do so, leaving the IRS with no system capable of detecting fraud. Its failure to meet the delivery deadline for developing an automated refund fraud detection system cost the IRS between US$200 million and US$300 million.

== See also ==
- VP/MS (Visual Product Modeling System), a modeling language and product lifecycle management tool by CSC
- Top 100 US Federal Contractors
- CSRA Inc., formed by a merger of CSC's North American Public Sector and SRA International
- Team CSC and other names 2003–2010. Professional cycling sponsorship under team owner Bjarne Riis.
