= MOBIDIC =

Transistorized computer

MOBIle DIgital Computer
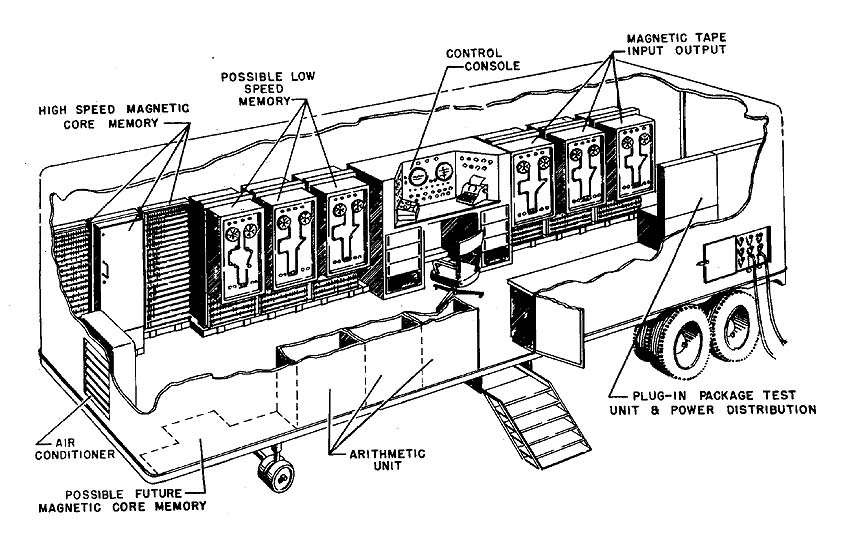
- Cutaway diagram of a MOBIDIC trailer
- Codename: MOBIDIC
- Manufacturer: Sylvania Electric Products
- Product family: MOBIDIC
- Type: Mobile trailer computer
- Released: December 1959
- Introductory price: $20-30 million USD
- Discontinued: 1960s
- Media: Tape
- CPU: 36 & 40 bit, 52 instruction
- Memory: 2-7 banks of 4098 word core memory
- Storage: Tape drives, punch tape
- Input: Flexowriter
- Connectivity: Other MOBIDIC units
- Power: 29.79kW, provided by generator van.
- Platform: Fieldata
- Dimensions: Four vans
- Weight: ~7000lbs-12000lbs
- Marketing target: American Army, Government, Commercial (9400)
- Successor: Sylvania 9400
- Language: COBOL

Sylvania's MOBIDIC, short for "MOBIle DIgital Computer", was a transistorized computer intended to store, sort and route information as one part of the United States Army's Fieldata concept. Fieldata aimed to automate the distribution of battlefield data in any form, ensuring the delivery of reports to the proper recipients regardless of the physical form they were sent or received. MOBIDIC was mounted in the trailer of a semi-trailer truck, while a second supplied power, allowing it to be moved about the battlefield. The Army referred to the system as the AN/MYK-1, or AN/MYK-2 for the dual-CPU version, Sylvania later offered a commercial version as the S 9400.

== History ==
In early 1956 the Army Signal Corps at Fort Monmouth released a contract tender for the development of a van-mounted mobile computer as part of their Fieldata efforts. Fieldata envisioned a system where any sort of reports would be converted into text format and then sent electronically around an extended battlefield. At the recipient's end, it would be converted into an appropriate output, often on a line printer or similar device. By automating the process of routing the messages in the middle of the information flow, the Signal Corps was hoping to guarantee delivery and improve responsiveness. Fieldata can be thought of as a general purpose version of the system the US Air Force was developing in their SAGE system, which did the same task but limited to the field of information about aircraft locations and status.

The heart of Fieldata would be computer systems that would receive, store, prioritize and send the messages. The machines would have to be built using transistors in order to meet the size and power requirements, so in effect, the Army was paying to develop transistorized computers. In spite of this, most established players ignored the Army's calls for the small machine. Sylvania's director of development speculated that the Army's terminology in the contract may have hidden the apparent wonderful opportunity. In the end, RCA and Sylvania entered bids, along with a number of smaller companies with unproven track records. Sylvania's bid was the lower of the "big two", and they won the contract in September 1956.

The first experimental machine, retroactively known as MOBIDIC A, was delivered to Fort Monmouth in December 1959. By this time the Army had expressed increasing interest in the concept and had ordered four additional machines and associated software, including a COBOL compiler. The original contract for the experimental machine was for $1.6 million, but the new developments increased the total to between $20 and $30 million.

MOBIDIC B was supplied to the Army's Tactical Operations Center and featured dual CPUs for increased reliability.

MOBIDIC A/B weighed about 12,000 pounds (6.0 short tons; 5.4 t).

MOBIDIC C was sent to Fort Huachuca as a software testing system. MOBIDIC D was ordered for the Army Security Agency in Europe, and MOBIDIC 7A was shipped to the 7th Army Stock Control Center in Zweibrücken, Germany. 7A's service entry was delayed due to the failure of the Army-supplied tape drives, but Sylvania replaced these with off-the-shelf commercial units and the system went operational in January 1962, the first off-shore deployment.

MOBIDIC C/D/7A weighed about 7,000 pounds (3.5 short tons; 3.2 t).

The 7A unit was extremely successful in operation, cutting the time needed to order and deliver spare parts dramatically. Although Fieldata was developed for battlefield information, MOBIDIC was just as useful for other sorts of information as well, as the 7A machine demonstrated. It was so successful that the MOBIDIC D was diverted to the Army's 3922nd Ordnance Supply Control Agency in Orléans, France (Maison Fort) to replace the existing RAMAC 305 card system.

By 1962, however, the Army had lost interest in Fieldata and canceled the project. The B machine was no longer needed for Fieldata software development, and in 1965 it was purchased by the National Bureau of Standards for software development and research. The C, D, and 7A machines were later all moved to Karlsruhe, Germany, where they operated in the supply role for years.

MOBIDIC's success, independent of Fieldata's failure, led to additional Army contracts for the smaller AN/APQ-32 computers, which processed artillery radar data. The basic layout of the MOBIDIC system was also used for the AN/ASD-1 computer used on the Boeing RC-135 ELINT aircraft, the PARADE and TIDEWATER projects, and its basic circuitry was used extensively in the development of the IBM 7090 for the BMEWS systems.

As Sylvania had hoped, commercial interest in a small, low-cost, robust computer system seemed widespread. MOBIDIC was adapted into the Sylvania 9400 that was marketed towards factory automation systems. Two systems were ordered, one by the Office of the Assistant Chief of Staff for Intelligence in the Pentagon, and another by General Telephone in California. However, as the costs of trying to compete in the commercial computer market became clear, Sylvania decided to withdraw from the market, and General Telephone (of which Sylvania was a wholly owned subsidiary) canceled their order. Both 9400's were built; General Telephone's intended delivery was used by Sylvania internally.

== Description ==
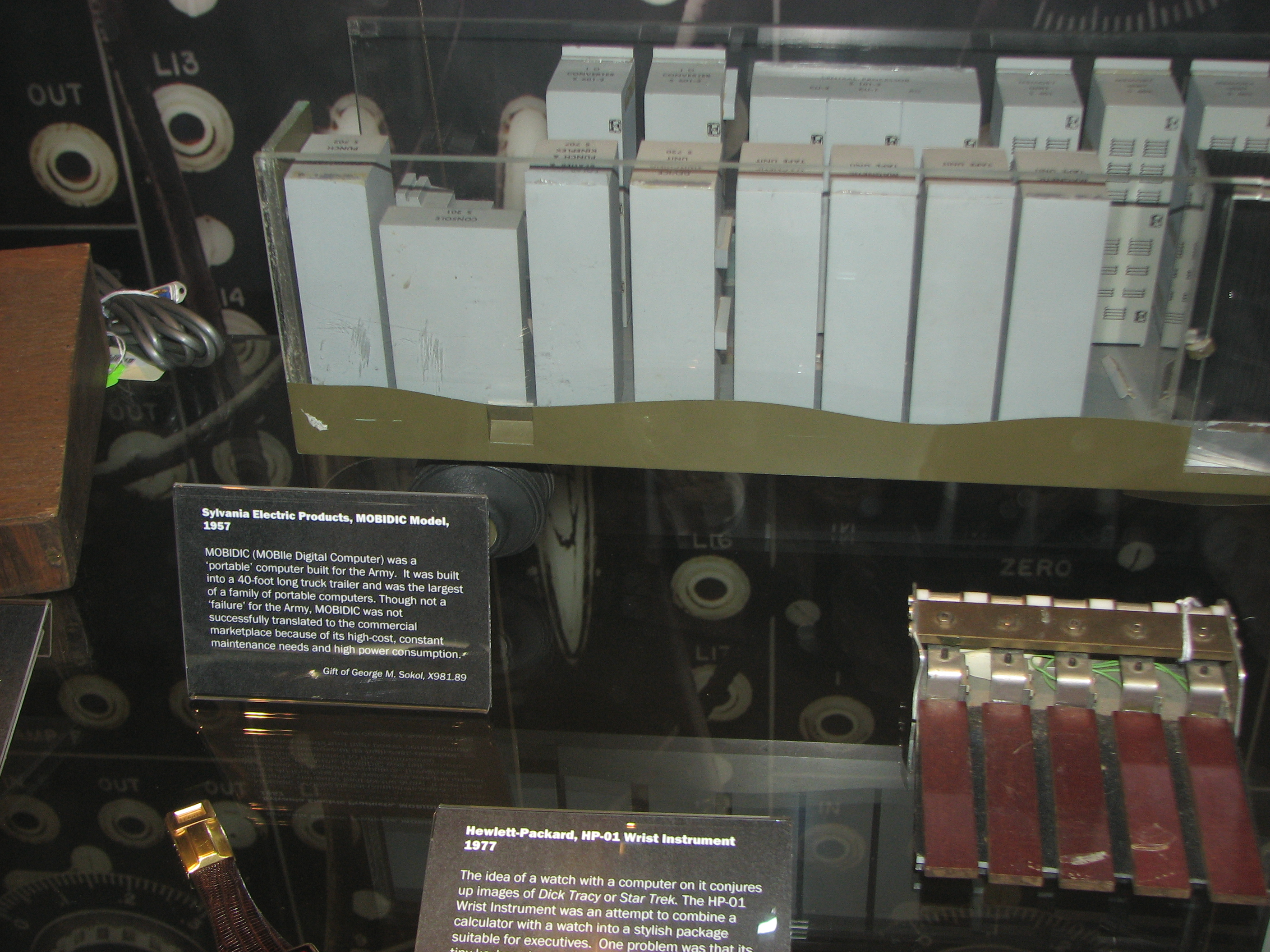
Model on display in the Computer History Museum

MOBIDIC's design goal was the real time operation of its input/output system. A typical use for MOBIDIC would be to collate all the messages flowing through an input to different tape outputs based on a field in the data. The tapes could then be removed and the messages printed on an offline printer. For instance, a large supply depot might have numerous warehouses for different sorts of materials; MOBIDIC could route incoming requests by examining the part number and then sending that message to a particular tape. All of the output on that tape would then be printed and sent to the associated warehouse. MOBIDIC replaced many manual steps; it performed the collation lookup, sorting the data, and collecting all the printed messages for delivery.

MOBIDIC was a 36-bit binary machine, a common word size for early computers. The system used 36-bit data throughout, but stored it as 40-bit values to add additional sign and parity bits, and two spares. This allowed it to store the full range from -(1 - 2^{−36}) to +(1 - 2^{−36}). Machines were normally equipped with two parallel banks of core memory with 4096 words each, but was expandable to seven banks maximum. It could support up to 63 tape drives, punch tape input and output, as well as a Flexowriter. One connection could also be dedicated to sending data to another MOBIDIC system. The tape drives used one of the spare bits in the 40-bit word as a STOP indicator.

Most of the 52 instructions were in the one-address format, collecting into an accumulator, but a small number (load, move, etc.) were in two-address format. There were 15 arithmetic, eight transfer (memory), 17 logic, three sense and nine input-output instructions. An add required 16 microseconds, a multiply or divide 86, these slow times a side effect of its serial operation.

MOBIDIC's CPU and I/O systems were housed in a 30-foot (10 meters) van. The machine required 29.76 kW of power, which was supplied from a second, smaller, van containing a generator set. Two other vans contained auxiliary EAM equipment and a repair shop. All four vans were backed up; two to a side, to a raised wooden platform with steps on one end. As this was the Cold War era, in case of enemy attack, everything could be moved instead of having to be abandoned and destroyed.

The dual-CPU MOBIDIC B (only one was produced) included three additional general instructions, as well as nine new instructions for supporting subroutines. The CPUs were independent but shared a single main memory consisting of 8,192 words of core. In a sample use, one of the CPUs would be used to import data, handing off data via shared memory to the second for output. Although the machine's speed was slower overall (adds were 42 μs), throughput could be greatly improved. If one of the machines failed, the program could be restarted on the remaining CPU, running both sides of the I/O task with reduced throughput.
