= UXC =

Australian IT services company

UXC Limited
- Company type: Subsidiary
- Traded as: UXC
- Industry: IT Consulting, managed services and support, outsourcing
- Founded: 2002
- Headquarters: Melbourne
- Area served: Australia, Asia Pacific
- Revenue: AUD $685 million
- Number of employees: 3000
- Parent: DXC Technology

UXC Ltd is an Australian company owned by DXC Technology, which operates in the IT services industry with over 3,000 employees in the private and public sectors across Australasia. UXC is composed of three distinct internal groups in various industry segments.

== History ==
UXC was founded in 2002. UXC grew from acquisitions. In 2011, UXC merged its formerly separate XSI Data Solutions, Integ, UXC Connect and Getronics Australia to form the UXC infrastructure group.

=== 2013 ===
UXC acquired US based Tectura for $21 million, ServiceNow partner Keystone for $27 million, and acquired White Labelled, an Australian E-commerce consultancy.

=== 2014 ===
The group acquired SaltBush Group in 2014.

=== 2015 ===
The group acquired the assets of contiigo in May 2015.

In November 2015, CSC agreed to acquire the shares of UXC in a deal valued at AUD427.6 million ($309 million).

=== 2016 ===
In February 2016, CSC finalised the acquisition of UXC for AUD427.6 million ($309 million).

== Business groups ==
The company operates in three business groups. They are:

- Consulting. Three separate entities deliver UXC's IT consulting services to the market, these are: UXC Consulting; UXC Professional Solutions and UXC Engineering Solutions. Services are provided by these entities are: Training, Business Transformation, Information Management, ITSM, Telecommunications Consulting, Project, Program & Portfolio Management, Change Management, IT Research, IT Strategy and Architecture, IT Professional Services and Mobility
- The Enterprise Applications grouping is represented by three UXC business units: Eclipse, Oxygen, and Red Rock Consulting. These provide consulting in and implement ERP systems for mid to large size organisations and individually represent Microsoft Dynamics, SAP and Oracle in the market.
- IT Infrastructure group is led by UXC Connect, this business specialises in the Workspace Innovation, Contact Centre, Security, Mobility, Cloud, Entertainment and Content, Managed Services, Data Centre Optimisation, and Outsourcing
