= Ticketron =

American ticketing company

Ticket Reservations Systems, Inc (TRS), doing business as Ticketron, was a computerized event ticketing company that was in operation from the 1960s until 1990. It was the industry leader until overtaken by its major rival, Ticketmaster. In 1990, the majority of Ticketron's assets and business were sold, and the following year they were sold on to Ticketmaster.

== History ==
TRS was incorporated on May 4, 1965, and based in New York. It was funded by Cemp Investments, headed by Edgar Bronfman Sr. It hired Jack Quinn who became president and the company started selling tickets in May 1967 from six Alexander's stores in New York and New Jersey using a duplexed Control Data Corporation CDC 1700 computer system with terminal equipment supplied by Computer Applications, Inc. that it called "electronic box offices". The same year, the first company to use the Ticketron name was founded in Fort Lee, New Jersey and its president was Clayton B. Hulsh. The original Ticketron unsuccessfully trialled its computerized ticketing system in summer 1967 and folded later that year. TRS acquired the name and began using it for its service in July 1969.

The original software resided on a pair (one for backup) of CDC 1700 computers located on the first floor of the Beverly Hilton Hotel with a large window facing Wilshire Blvd. The system had back-up power generators in the basement to help ensure un-interruptible service. The system was designed to ensure that a given 'seat' at an event could not be sold more than once. TRS's terminals expanded to other publicly accessible locations, such as banks and department stores.

In 1969, 51% of TRS was sold to Control Data Corp. for $3.9 million with Edgar Bronfman Sr. and his family retaining 25%. Former ABC television president, Thomas W. Moore became chairman of TRS.

Another competitor, Computicket, owned by Computer Sciences Corporation, folded in April 1970 leaving Ticketron as the sole computerized ticketing service in the US. In 1973, Control Data Corp bought out Cemp Investment, becoming sole owner. In 1979, Ticketron starting selling tickets by phone.

In addition to the better-known event ticketing system, Ticketron also provided ticketing terminals and back-end infrastructure for parimutuel betting, and provided similar services for a number of US lotteries, including those in New York, Illinois, Pennsylvania, Delaware, Washington and Maryland.

By the mid 1980s, Ticketron had 600 outlets in 22 US states and Canada. By 1990, Ticketron had 750 outlets and had a 40% market share, behind Ticketmaster, which had been founded in 1976, with 50% of the market. In 1990 the majority of Ticketron's assets and business, with the exception of a small antitrust carve-out for The Shubert Organization's Telecharge unit (which largely operates ticketing for Broadway theatres), were bought by The Carlyle Group who sold it the following year to rival Ticketmaster.

== New company ==
The Ticketron name was revived in 2017 as an online ticket service, Ticketron.com, after Ticketmaster sold the brand name in 2017.
