= Lothian, Borders & Angus Co-operative Society =

Consumer co-operative in Scotland, 1839–2008

- Company type: Consumer co-operative
- Industry: Retail, Pharmacy, Funerals, Post offices, Filling stations
- Founded: 1839 or earlier
- Defunct: December 13, 2008
- Fate: Merged ("Transfer of engagements")
- Successor: The Co-operative Group
- Headquarters: Galashiels, Scotland, UK
- Area served: Scotland
- Key people: I.F.B. Hewat, President; Bob Jamieson, Chief Executive
- Revenue: £122 million (2008)
- Operating income: + £4 million (2008)
- Net income: + £3.5 million (2008)
- Members: 65,074 (2008)
- Number of employees: 1,234 (2008)

Lothian, Borders & Angus Co-operative Society Limited (Lothian Co-op), founded in 1839 in the Scottish Borders, was the oldest independent consumer co-operative in Scotland until it merged with The Co-operative Group in December 2008. It operated over 50 food stores in the south and east, as well as some other retail businesses, and funeral services. At the time of the merger, Lothian Co-op was owned by 65,000 consumer members on a one member one vote basis.

On the 19 August 2008, the board of the society agreed to propose the transfer of the society's engagements to the much larger Co-operative Group. The proposed transfer was considered by Lothian Borders & Angus members at a series of meetings in the autumn and, with a majority of the membership in favour of the proposal, the transfer of engagements took place on 13 December 2008.

== History ==
Lothian Co-op was the direct successor of nineteenth and early twentieth century consumer co-operatives in its trading area, the oldest being in the border towns of Galashiels and Hawick. The Galashiels co-operative was formed by a mill workers' association that was already operating along similar lines. The Hawick and Galashiels co-operatives were formed in 1839, five years before the Rochdale Pioneers shop opened in England. Therefore, Lothian Co-op was, at the time of merger, probably the oldest continuously trading consumer co-operative in Scotland.

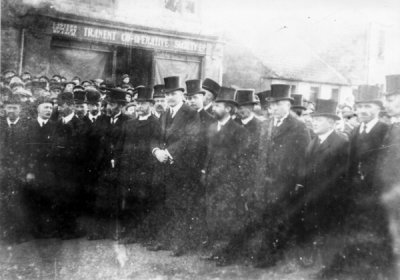
Tranent Co-operative Society was formed in 1862, and took the name East Lothian in 1940

Through 1991, the Galashiels co-operative expanded through mergers to serve the Scottish Borders and Dumfries and Galloway regions. In 1992, Border Regional Co-operative Society merged with East Lothian Co-operative Society (based in Tranent), becoming Lothian and Borders Co-operative Society. In 1998, it absorbed East Angus Co-operative Society of Arbroath, taking its final name and structure.

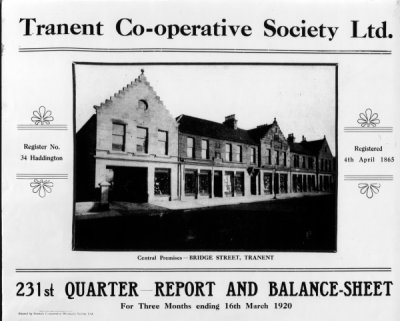
The Industrial Revolution flooded Scotland's mill and mining towns with workers, whose co-operatives thrived

In the early 21st century, growth continued through new construction and acquisitions from other grocers. New construction included a supermarket in Castle Douglas, and purchases included a former SPAR store in North Berwick, a filling station in Lauder, and, notably, nine convenience stores sold by Somerfield in 2006, Lothian Co-op's first operation in Aberdeenshire.

== Operations ==
Lothian Co-op was a regional co-operative, formed by the gradual amalgamation of numerous local co-operatives. Operating 52 food stores in southern and eastern Scotland, as well as pharmacies, funeral services, post offices, petrol stations, and a furnishings store in Selkirk, it was the smaller of Scotland's two regional consumer co-operatives until 2008, the larger being Scotmid, and one of four altogether. Lothian Co-op was a member (customer owner) of The Co-operative Group, sourcing its food through a UK-wide buying programme called the Co-operative Retail Trading Group.) From 2006, it bought home furnishings stock through the Anglia Buying Group, a national buying programme operated by Anglia Regional Co-operative Society.

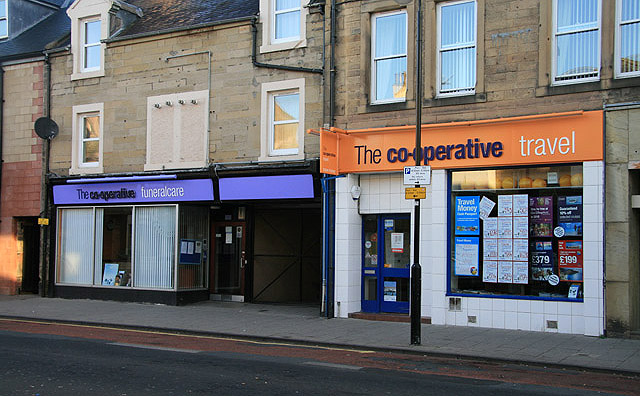
Funeral and travel premises in Channel Street, Galashiels, photographed in 2009 a few months after the merger with the Co-operative Group

Chief executive Bob Jamieson served as a director of The Co-operative Group from 2005.

Like most retail consumers' co-operatives in the UK, Lothian Co-op was incorporated as an industrial and provident society, regulated by the Financial Services Authority.

== Ownership and governance ==
Lothian Co-op was at the time of its merger owned by 65,000 consumer members, who invested in equity shares, with share balances averaging £12 each, and earning 3% interest per year.

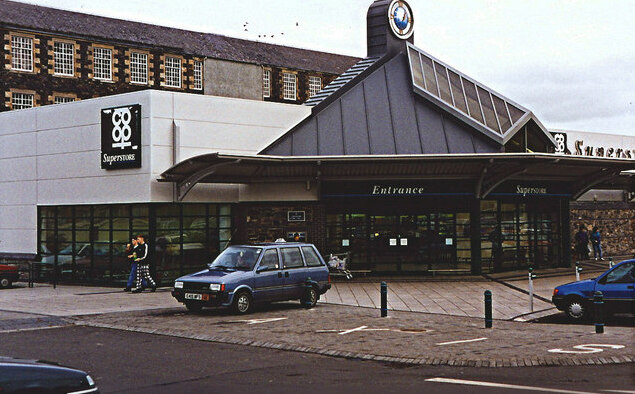
Lothian and Borders Co-op rebuilt the frontage of its Galashiels supermarket in the early 1990s. The site was later purchased by Tesco.

It did not pay a patronage dividend to members, though each year around £90,000 of profits was distributed to local causes as “Community Dividend Grants”, and taxable profit was re-invested in the business. A voluntary president and board of directors were elected from among the members holding at least four shares, on a one member one vote basis; the board supervised the chief executive and management. Like many UK listed companies and co-operatives, the board had an audit sub-committee responsible for internal controls, following the 1999 Turnbull Report.
