= Ohio National Life Insurance Company =

Mutual insurance company headquartered in Cincinnati, Ohio, United States

Coordinates: 39.247563°N 84.363899°W

- Company type: Public Company
- Industry: Financial services
- Founded: September 9, 1909; 116 years ago in Cincinnati, Ohio, United States
- Headquarters: Cincinnati, Ohio, U.S.
- Area served: United States and parts of South America
- Key people: Gary T. “Doc” Huffman, CEO, Barbara A. Turner, President & COO
- Products: Insurance, Annuities, Investments
- AUM: US$ 42 billion (2017)
- Number of employees: 1,000+ (2018)
- Website: ohionational.com

The Ohio National Life Insurance Company was a mutual insurance company headquartered in Cincinnati, Ohio, United States. Along with its affiliated companies, the Ohio National group offered life insurance, annuities, disability insurance, group retirement plans, and investment products. It sold products in all fifty states, the District of Columbia, and Puerto Rico.

Ohio National had an international presence as well, and maintained an office in Fort Lauderdale, Florida, where it managed its operations in South America. It owned a South American subsidiary headquartered in Santiago, Chile, and sold products in Chile, Brazil, and Peru.

Ohio National Mutual Holdings, Inc. was parent to the following companies:

- The Ohio National Life Insurance Company
- Ohio National Life Assurance Corporation
- Ohio National Equities, Inc.
- The O.N. Equity Sales Company
- Ohio National Investments, Inc.
- National Security Life and Annuity Company
- Ohio National Seguros de Vida, S.A.

== History ==
Ohio National was founded as a stock company in 1909 but converted to mutual company status in 1959. In 1998, Ohio National reorganized as a mutual insurance holding company (Ohio National Mutual Holdings, Inc.), with an intermediate holding company (Ohio National Financial Services, Inc.).

The company signed a contract to take over a facility at Lunken Airport from Executive Jet Management around 2000.

In September 2018, Ohio National announced an exit from most of the annuity market, and the layoff of approximately 300 of its then 1300 employees, as part of a new focused growth strategy targeting the life insurance market. Ohio National continues to sell life insurance, disability insurance, and immediate annuities, and reaffirmed its commitment to the Latin American market. As a result of the change in strategy, Standard & Poor's lowered its rating from A+ to A, while Moody's reaffirmed its A1 rating and A.M. Best reaffirmed its A+ rating.

In March 2021, the Board of Directors of Ohio National voted to demutualize in anticipation of a sale to Constellation Insurance Holdings. Constellation rebranded as AuguStar Life Insurance and AuguStar Retirement in July 2023.

== Philanthropy ==
In 1987, the company started The Ohio National Foundation, which donated more than $22 million to nonprofit organizations through 2017. Primary recipients included the United Way; the Duncanson Artist-in-Residence Program at the Taft Museum of Art recognizing contemporary African-American artists; Habitat for Humanity; and the Make-a-Wish Foundation. In 2001, Ohio National started displaying a Victorian Holiday Village on the grounds of the headquarters each winter, and through 2017 had collected over 15 tons of donated food for charity.
