= DATAmatic 1000 =

1957 computer system by Honeywell

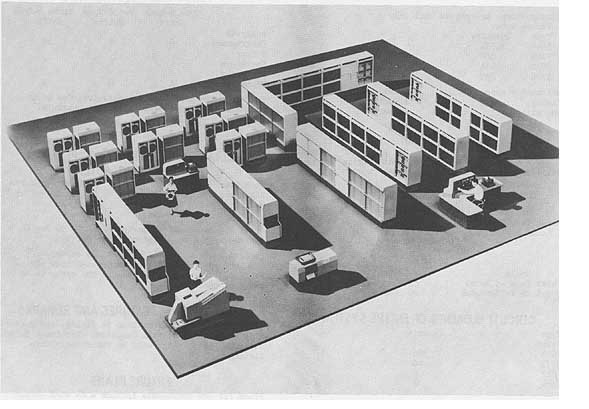
DATAmatic 1000 computer system

The DATAmatic 1000 is an obsolete computer system from Honeywell introduced in 1957. It uses vacuum tubes and crystal diodes for logic, and featured a unique magnetic tape format for storage.

The CPU uses a 48-bit word (plus four check bits). A word can hold twelve decimal digits (eleven digits plus sign) or eight six-bit alphanumeric characters. The system includes magnetic core storage of 2000 words or 24,000 digits in two banks, called "High-Speed Memory." Words in High-Speed Memory are also called "registers" in the documentation. The system also includes two input and two output tape buffer storage units of 62 words (744 digits) each.

The instructions are three address and all operations are storage-to-storage.

== History ==
Datamatic Corporation was established in 1954 as a joint venture of Raytheon and Honeywell. In 1955, Honeywell bought out Raytheon's interest and the company became known as "Honeywell DATAmatic." Later Datamatic was renamed Honeywell Information Systems (HIS).

== Tape format ==
The DATAmatic uses reels of magnetic tape 2,700 feet (820 m) long and 3 inches (7.6 cm) wide. The tape format uses 36 tracks ("channels")—31 data and five for checking. Data is recorded as blocks of 62 words. Within a block, two words are recorded serially on each of the 31 tracks. A full reel of tape can contain 50,000 blocks (37,200,000 words). Data transfer rate is 60,000 digits per second. A DATAmatic 1000 system can attach up to 100 tape units.

When the tape is initially written data is recorded only in alternate blocks. When the end of the reel is reached the tape is recorded in reverse in previously unused blocks. This eliminates a rewind operation when reading or writing full reels. The format allows individual blocks to be rewritten in place.

== Other peripherals ==
Standard card, paper tape, and line printer output was via offline input and output converters that wrote or read magnetic tape. Available peripheral devices included:

- Punched card reader, standard 80-column punched cards, 900 cards per minute
- Punched tape reader, 60 characters per second
- Line printer, 900 lines per minute
- Punched card output – 100 cards per minute

== Staffing ==
Typical staffing for a DATAmatic 1000 installation (per shift) might be 32 people tasked with:

- Supervisors 1
- Analysts 5
- Programmers 11
- Coders 2
- Clerks 3
- Operators 2
- Input/output operators 6
- Tape handlers 2

(Bank of Boston, 1961)
