= James E. Thornton =

American computer engineer (1925–2005)

- Born: September 25, 1925; Saint Paul, Minnesota
- Died: January 11, 2005 (aged 79)
- Occupation: Computer engineer

James E. Thornton (September 25, 1925, in Saint Paul, Minnesota – January 11, 2005) was an American computer engineer.

Thornton studied electrical engineering at the University of Minnesota earning a bachelor's degree in 1950. Immediately afterwards he went to Engineering Research Associates (ERA), which was acquired by Remington Rand in 1952. In 1958 he left with other ERA engineers to form the new Control Data Corporation (CDC). He remained there until 1973 and was involved in the development of the CDC 1604, CDC 6600, 6400, 6500, and the STAR-100. With Seymour Cray, he was the main developer of the pioneering supercomputer CDC 6600 (the first of the CDC 6000 series), which came onto the market in 1964.

In 1974 he co-founded Network Systems Corporation, which manufactured computer networks connecting mainframes and minicomputers, including HYPERchannel.

In 1994 he received the Eckert-Mauchly Award "for his pioneering work on high performance processors; for inventing the scoreboard for instruction issue; and for fundamental contributions to vector supercomputing." In 1997 he received the Harry H. Goode Memorial Award from the IEEE Computer Society "for pioneering contributions and leadership in high performance computing and networking."
