= Robert M. Price (business executive) =

American computer scientist and businessman (1930–2020)

- Born: September 26, 1930; New Bern, NC
- Died: December 31, 2020 (aged 90)
- Education: Duke University (BS); Georgia Institute of Technology (MS)
- Known for: CEO of Control Data Corporation
- Spouse: Mary Hope Walker (1952-2020)
- Parent(s): Mary Anne Yow Price and Robert McCollum Price

Robert M. Price (September 26, 1930 – December 31, 2020) was an American computer scientist and business executive. After graduation from Duke University in 1952, he moved to California and worked as a computer programmer at the Lawrence Livermore Laboratory and the Convair division of General Dynamics Corporation. He and Mary Hope Walker were married on August 21, 1952. He gained a Master's degree in mathematics from Georgia Tech in 1958. He began his professional career for the Control Data Corporation in 1961 as a mathematician staff specialist. His responsibilities there expanded to software sales and services, international sales, and several executive positions, culminating with serving as president and chief executive officer from 1986 to 1989.

He also led the founding in 1985 of the National Center for Social Entrepreneurs. He was interim chairman and CEO of International Multifoods Corporation during 1996–97, now part of Smuckers. After retiring from Control Data, he taught business strategy at Duke University's Fuqua School of Business for 15 years, and also taught at the Pratt School of Engineering at Duke. Price was president and CEO of PSV, Inc., offering services in technology commercialization, corporate strategy, and human resource management.

== Career ==
Price joined Control Data in 1961 as a mathematician staff specialist, became director, international operations, in 1963; group vice president, services, in 1972; and president and chief operating officer (COO) in 1980. Price led Control Data's early expansion into international operations and marketing as well as the strategic move into information and systems integration services. Price succeeded the company's founder, William C. Norris, as chairman of the board and CEO of Control Data Corporation (now Ceridian Corporation). He retired in 1990 after 29 years with Control Data.

In 1985 Price led a consortium of corporations and individuals in the founding of the National Center for Social Entrepreneurs (NCSE), for which he served as chairman for many years. The center's mission is to encourage entrepreneurship throughout the non-profit sector, and to help individual non profits create or expand social purpose business ventures. Price served for many years on the boards of the Guthrie Theater, the Minnesota Opera, and the Greater Minneapolis United Way; and was a donor to Santa Fe Opera, the University of Minnesota's Athletic Program and School of Veterinary Medicine, and The Nature Conservancy.

Price taught in Duke University's Fuqua School of Business for 15 years and was an adjunct professor in the Pratt School of Engineering at Duke. He published in the Harvard Business Review and California Management Review and various business publications. He was a guest lecturer at numerous colleges and universities, including Cornell University's Samuel Curtis Johnson Graduate School of Management; University of Minnesota's Carlson School of Management; and Northwestern University's Kellogg School of Management.

He served on the advisory board of New York University's Courant Institute; Duke's Fuqua School of Business; Georgia Tech's College of Arts and Sciences. As a member of the Education Committee of the Business Roundtable, he served as an advisor to New Mexico's State Department of Education and helped found the New Mexico Governor's Business Executives for Education.

== Selected publications ==
"Commitment Without Involvement." Harvard Business Review 62 no. 5 (1984): 162-171

"Supercomputers Propel Technology." Vital Speeches of the Day 54 no. 14 (1988): 435-438 (delivered at the Congressional Economic Leadership Institute Luncheon in Washington, D.C., on February 25, 1988)

"Computers in the '90s." Vital Speeches of the Day 56 no. 17 (1990): 530 (delivered at the Minnesota Executive Speaker Series, February 13, 1990)

"Executive Forum: Technology and Strategic Advantage." Harvard Business Review (April 1996) case study

"Technology and Strategic Advantage." California Management Review 38 no. 3 (Spring 1996): 38–56.

"Technology and Strategic Advantage." IEEE Engineering Management Review 26 no. 2 (1998): 26–36.

The Eye for Innovation: Recognizing Possibilities and Managing the Creative Enterprise. New Haven: Yale University Press, 2005 ISBN 030010877X

"When the Alligator is About to Bite." Directors & Boards 30 no. 4 (2006): 26–30.

"Infusing Innovation into Corporate Culture." Organizational Dynamics 36 no. 3 (2007): 320–328.

"Sowing the Seeds of Innovation." Leader to Leader Issue 43 (Winter 2007): 7–12. DOI

Building the Control Data Legacy: The Career of Robert M. Price. Edited by Thomas J. Misa. Minneapolis: Charles Babbage Institute, 2012 ISBN 1300058188 available online
