= IT History Society =

Preservation and study of computer history

- Formation: 2007
- Purpose: Promote and facilitate the preservation and study of the history of Internet Technology and be a "table of contents" of where information technology history is located
- Origins: Charles Babbage Foundation
- Region served: World-wide
- Members: 700+
- Chairman: Jeffery Stein
- Main organ: Board of Directors
- Website: www.ithistory.org

The IT History Society (ITHS) is an organization that supports the history and scholarship of information technology by encouraging, fostering, and facilitating archival and historical research. Formerly known as the Charles Babbage Foundation, it advises historians, promotes collaboration among academic organizations and museums, and assists IT corporations in preparing and archiving their histories for future studies.

== Activities ==
The IT History Society provides background information to those with an interest in the history of Information Technology, including papers that provide advice on how to perform historical work and how historical activities can benefit private sector organizations. It tracks historical projects seeking funding as well as projects underway and completed. It maintains online, publicly available, lists of events pertaining to IT history, IT history resources, an IT Honor Roll acknowledging more than 700 individuals who have made a noteworthy contribution to the information technology industry, and a database of notable technology quotes.

A continuing project is one of aggregating the locations and content of IT history archival information around the world to facilitate and encourage IT history research and scholarship. This International Database of Historical and Archival Sites currently consists of 1,663 international information technology historical and archival collections encompassing over 49.8 million documents. An IT Hardware database has been added consisting of 12,187 entries, an IT Honor Roll with 1,031 entries, and a Technical Quotes database with over 1,000 entries. These databases are being added to on a regular basis an IT Software and IT Companies databases will debut soon. ITHS holds an annual meeting and conference.

== History ==
The International Charles Babbage Society was founded in 1978 and operated out of Palo Alto, California. The following year the American Federation of Information Processing Societies (AFIPS) became a principal sponsor of the society, which was renamed the Charles Babbage Institute. In 1980, the institute moved to the University of Minnesota, which contracted with the principals of the Charles Babbage Institute to sponsor and house the institute. A new entity, the Charles Babbage Foundation, was created to help support and govern the institute, in partnership with the university. In 1989, CBI became an organized research unit of the university.

Around 2000, CBF broadened its mission to support the history of information technology through other organizations, collaborating, for example, with the Sloan Foundation, Software History Center, and the Computer History Museum in experimenting with Internet-based archival and historical research. In 2002, the Charles Babbage Foundation broadened its mission to support the entire IT history community. In 2007, CBF changed its name to the IT History Society and reworked its programs to better support the IT history community.

=== Charles Babbage Institute ===
The Charles Babbage Institute is a research center at the University of Minnesota specializing in the history of information technology, particularly the history of digital computing, programming/software, and computer networking since 1935. The institute is named for Charles Babbage, the nineteenth-century English inventor of the programmable computer. The institute is located in Elmer L. Andersen Library at the University of Minnesota Libraries in Minneapolis, Minnesota.

==== Babbage Activities ====
In addition to holding important historical archives, in paper and electronic form, its staff of historians and archivists conduct and publish historical and archival research that promotes the study of the history of information technology internationally. CBI also encourages research in the area and related topics (such as archival methods); to do this, it offers graduate fellowships and travel grants, organizes conferences and workshops, and participates in public programming. It also serves as an international clearinghouse of resources for the history of information technology.

Also valuable for researchers are its extensive collection of oral history interviews, more than 400 in total. Oral histories with important early figures in the field have been conducted by CBI staff and collaborating colleagues. Owing to the poorly documented state of many early computer developments, these oral histories are immensely valuable documents. One author called the set of CBI oral histories "a priceless resource for any historian of computing." Most of CBI's oral histories are transcribed and available online.

The archival collection also contains manuscripts; records of professional associations; corporate records (including the Burroughs corporate records and the Control Data corporate records, among many others); trade publications; periodicals; manuals and product literature for older systems, photographic material (stills and moving), and a variety of other rare reference materials.

It is now a center at the University of Minnesota, and is located on its Twin Cities, Minneapolis campus, where it is housed in the Elmer L. Andersen Library on the West Bank.

==== Archival papers and oral histories ====
The CBI has collections of archival papers and oral histories from many notable figures in computing including:

- Gene Amdahl
- Walter L. Anderson
- Isaac L. Auerbach
- Rebecca Bace
- Charles W. Bachman
- Paul Baran
- Jean Bartik
- Edmund Berkeley
- James Bidzos
- Gertrude Blanch
- Vint Cerf
- John Day
- Edsger W. Dijkstra
- Wallace John Eckert
- Alexandra Illmer Forsythe
- Margaret R. Fox
- Gideon Gartner
- Bruce Gilchrist
- George Glaser
- Martin A. Goetz
- Gene H. Golub
- Carl Hammer
- Martin Hellman
- Frances E. Holberton
- Cuthbert Hurd
- Anita K. Jones
- Brian Kahin
- Donald Knuth
- Bryan S. Kocher
- Mark P. McCahill
- Daniel D. McCracken
- Alex McKenzie
- Carl Machover
- Michael Mahoney
- Marvin Minsky
- Calvin N. Mooers
- William C. Norris
- Susan Nycum
- Donn B. Parker
- Alan J. Perlis
- Robert M. Price
- Claire K. Schultz
- Erwin Tomash
- Keith Uncapher
- Willis Ware
- Terry Winograd
- Patrick Winston
- Konrad Zuse

==== CBI History ====
CBI was founded in 1978 by Erwin Tomash and associates as the International Charles Babbage Society, and initially operated in Palo Alto, California.

In 1979, the American Federation of Information Processing Societies (AFIPS) became a principal sponsor of the Society, which was renamed the Charles Babbage Institute.

In 1980, the institute moved to the University of Minnesota, which contracted with the principals of the Charles Babbage Institute to sponsor and house the institute. In 1989, CBI became an organized research unit of the university.

== See also ==
- History of computing
- History of computing hardware
- History of operating systems
- History of the internet
- Internet governance
- List of pioneers in computer science
- Standards Setting Organization
