= HYPERchannel =

HYPERchannel, sometimes rendered Hyperchannel, was a local area networking system for mainframe computers, especially supercomputers, introduced by Network Systems Corporation in the 1970s. It ran at the then-fast speed of 50 Mbits/second, performance that would not be matched by commodity hardware until the introduction of Fast Ethernet in 1995. HYPERchannel ran over very thick coax cable or fibre optic extensions and required adaptor hardware the size of a minicomputer. The networking protocol was entirely proprietary. Solutions for Control Data, IBM, UNISYS, and Cray computers were their primary products, but a wide variety of support emerged in the 1980s, including DEC VAX, and similar superminicomputers.

The introduction of 10 mbit/sec Ethernet in the 1980s was a major problem for the HYPERchannel product, one the company never clearly addressed. The company introduced products to allow HYPERchannel protocols to travel over Ethernet, and systems that allowed Ethernet-equipped computers to connect to HYPERchannel systems, as well as TCP/IP and other standard protocol support. However, these generally had the side-effect of further eroding the need for the product, other than raw performance, and it found itself pressed into an ever smaller niche that was eventually killed off by new systems with dramatically higher performance.

== Hyperchannel operation ==
The early A-series Hyperchannel adapters had a device interface and a trunk (LAN) interface, which could drive up to four coaxial trunks, each carrying 50 Mbit/s. Intercommunication between adapters was always across the trunk.

The A-series adapter had a processor made from discrete, high-speed ECL components, with an 8K program memory and a 4K or an 8K data memory. Data memory was divided, so that one half could be being filled from the device interface while the other half was emptying onto the trunk interface, or vice versa.

The device interface was interchangeable, and could use a selected board to attach to an IBM FIPS channel, or to a Cray channel, CDC channel, or to a communications link so it could communicate with remote installations. A major product was RDS (Remote Device Support), in which an IBM mainframe could connect to an adapter through its FIPS channel, which would communicate over a trunk to an adapter with a comms link, possibly to another continent, where it could drive a remote FIPS channel to drive IBM peripherals such as tape units, printers and the like. This gave remote backup possibilities to save data onto a remote site in real time, to protect data in case of disaster at the host location. Both sites could have host computers, and backup could be bidirectional. For RDS, the remote adapter emulated the IBM host by producing the channel protocol.

The Hyperchannel Trunk was a LAN made of up to four parallel coaxial cables carrying 50 Mbit/s, which, at the time, was considered leading-edge technology. There could be many adapters on the trunk, so that, for example, mainframes of different types could inter-communicate across the trunk network that could also have an adapter for telecomms links to other locations. If a trunk was busy, the adapter would try the next trunk. Trunk protocol was timing-based, and three timers had to be manually calculated and set on each adapter due to data being limited to the speed of light (which travels at about 1 ft/nS), and if a new adapter was installed on the trunk (thus changing the length of the trunk), the timers on all adapters on the trunk had to be revised. Each adapter had an address, set on thumb-wheel switches.

The A-series adapter was later supplanted by the DX adapter, which was microprocessor-based, and could contain a selection of device cards, trunk boards, link boards, as well as LAN and WAN cards including Ethernet, FDDI, Token Ring, or an IP router board for IP communication, in a chassis of up to 16 slots. As it could contain more than one device interface board, it could handle inter-device communication without resort to the Hyperchannel trunk, which was only retained for communication with legacy equipment.
