= William Norris (CEO) =

American businessman

William Charles Norris
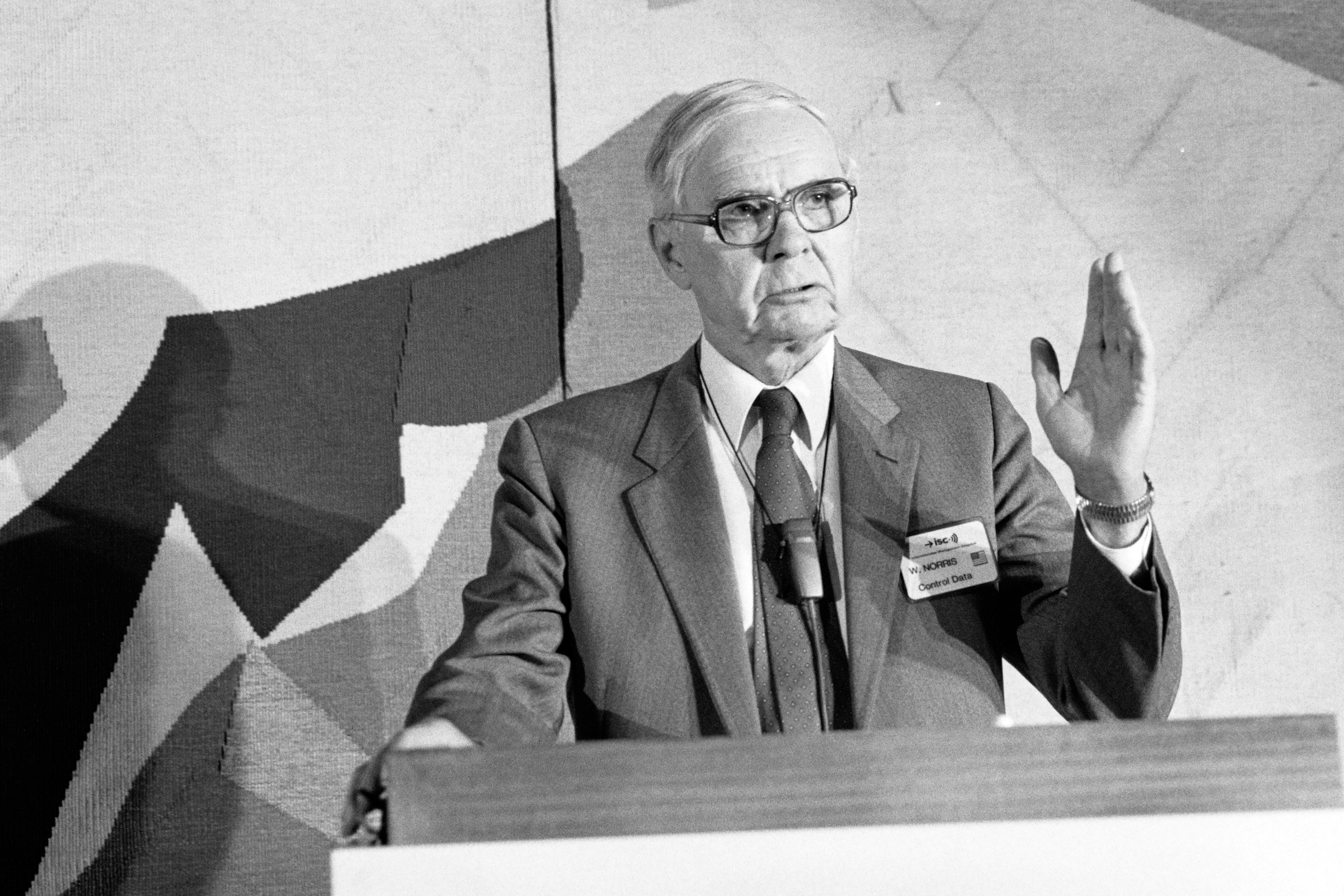
- Born: July 14, 1911 near Red Cloud, Nebraska, United States
- Died: August 21, 2006 (aged 95); Bloomington, Minnesota
- Education: University of Nebraska
- Occupation: Computer executive
- Employer(s): Westinghouse, Engineering Research Associates, Sperry Rand
- Known for: Chief Executive Officer of Control Data Corporation
- Spouse: Jane Malley Norris
- Children: William, George, Daniel, Brian, Roger, David, Constance Van Hoven and Mary Keck
- Awards: IEEE Founders Medal (1985)

William Charles Norris (July 14, 1911, near Red Cloud, Nebraska – August 21, 2006) was an American business executive. He was the CEO of Control Data Corporation, at one time one of the most powerful and respected computer companies in the world. He is famous for taking on IBM in a head-on fight and winning, as well as being a social activist who used Control Data's expansion in the late 1960s to bring jobs and training to inner cities and disadvantaged communities.

== Early life ==
Norris was born and raised on a cattle farm in Nebraska, attending a tiny school in Inavale, Nebraska, and operating a ham radio. He attained a degree in electrical engineering from the University of Nebraska in 1932. He spent two years on his family's farm after graduation, helping weather the Great Depression and a significant drought in the Midwest by risking the use of Russian thistle as cattle feed.

== Military career ==
Norris served in the United States Navy as a codebreaker, attaining the rank of lieutenant commander while working at the Navy's Nebraska Avenue Complex in Washington, D.C. His technical accomplishments included advancing methods for identifying U-boats.

== Professional career ==
Before entering military service, Norris sold X-Ray equipment for the Westinghouse Corporation in Chicago, then worked for the Bureau of Ordnance as a civil servant engineer until signing with the Naval Reserve.

Norris entered the computer business just after World War II, when along with Howard Engstrom and other US Navy cryptographers he formed Engineering Research Associates (ERA) in January, 1946 to build scientific computers. He hired forty of the members of his codebreaking team and set up shop in a glider factory with Northwestern Aeronautical, a major government contractor. ERA was fairly successful, but in the early 1950s a lengthy series of government probes into "Navy funding" drained the company and it was sold to Remington Rand. They operated within Remington Rand as a separate division for a time, but during the later merger with Sperry Corporation that formed Sperry Rand, their division was merged with UNIVAC. This resulted in most of ERA's work being dropped. As a result, several employees left and set up Control Data, unanimously selecting Norris as president.

Control Data started by selling magnetic drum memory systems to other computer manufacturers, but introduced their own mainframe, the CDC 1604, in 1958. Designed primarily by Seymour Cray, the company soon followed the 1604 with a series of increasingly powerful machines. In 1965 they introduced the CDC 6600, the first supercomputer, and CDC was suddenly in the leadership position with a machine ten times faster than anything on the market.

This was a significant threat to IBM's business, and they quickly started a project of their own to take back the performance crown from CDC. In the meantime they announced an advanced version of the IBM System/360, called the ACS-1, that was to be faster than the 6600. However, the machine didn't yet exist, and after carefully documenting sales lost to the IBM project, Norris launched a massive lawsuit against them in 1968. IBM was unable to finish its "6600 killer," and CDC eventually won the suit, and was awarded $600 million in damages.

In 1967 Norris attended a seminar for CEOs where Whitney Young, head of the National Urban League, spoke about the social and economic injustices in the lives of young black Americans. This speech, along with a summer of violence in Norris's hometown of Minneapolis, greatly disturbed him. He became a champion of moving factories into the inner-cities, providing stable incomes and "high-tech" training to thousands of people who would otherwise have little chance at either.

Another CDC project that Norris championed was the PLATO system, an online teaching and instruction system developed at the University of Illinois at Urbana–Champaign. The university developed most of the system on a CDC-1604 machine driving graphics terminals of their own design. In 1974 they reached an agreement with CDC to allow CDC to sell PLATO in exchange for free machines on which to run it. PLATO was released in 1975, but saw almost no use due to its high costs and complex maintenance. In the end PLATO did see some use as an employee training tool in large companies, but was never a success in the education market.

Norris continually purchased new companies to fold into CDC, and eventually returned to the peripheral market in the 1970s. This move proved particularly wise. During the early 1970s, Seymour Cray left to form his own company, which quickly drove CDC out of its leadership position in the supercomputer market. This left CDC in second place in a market for a small number of machines. Soon large Japanese companies were gobbling up what Cray didn't. CDC tried to regain its footing in the supercomputer market by spinning off ETA Systems, in order to allow the developers to escape an increasingly ossified management structure inside CDC. However this effort failed and CDC gave up on the market entirely.

In the 1980s CDC was left primarily as a hard disk manufacturer, and their series of SCSI drives were particularly successful. But at this point the rest of the company crashed, and the board started pressuring Norris to step down. They were particularly harsh in blaming his social programs for their problems, although any connection is difficult, if not impossible, to find. He eventually realized there was little he could do to stop this course of action, and started an effort to place the company under the leadership of two hand-picked replacements. The stockholders didn't go along with this, and Norris subsequently retired in January 1986. His successor as Control Data CEO was Robert M. Price.

William Norris died on August 21, 2006, in a nursing home in Bloomington, Minnesota, after a long battle with Parkinson's disease. He was survived by his wife Jane Malley Norris, eight children, sons William, George, Daniel, Brian, Roger and David, and daughters Constance Van Hoven and Mary Keck, 21 grandchildren, and six great-grandchildren.

== See also ==
- Charles Babbage Institute

== Bibliography ==
- Lundstrom, David (1987). A Few Good Men From Univac. MIT Press. ISBN 0262121204.
- Murray, Charles (1997). The Supermen: The Story of Seymour Cray and the Technical Wizards behind the Supercomputer. John Wiley & Sons. ISBN 0-471-04885-2.
