= Control Data Institute =

Defunct vocational school in the United States

Control Data Institute (CDI) was an international technical vocational school created by the American Control Data Corporation in the mid-1960s.

== Historical timeline ==
- 1965 Control Data Corporation established Control Data Institutes in the United States.
- 1967 The first foreign Institute was established in Frankfurt.
- 1976 The PLATO computer-based education system was announced.
- 1977 PLATO Systems were implemented at all United States Institutes.
- 1978 Institutes and learning centers numbered sixty-nine worldwide.
- 1989 Institutes in the United States (Control Data Institute and the Institute for Advanced Technology) were sold off by Control Data Corporation to Human Capital Corporation, Edina, MN. At that time, the two business served 18,000 students/attendees. Terms of the cash sale were not disclosed. The company was named "Career Development Institutes", however they did not last very long, and they then sold the Canadian Schools to A.B. McKelvey, who had been a VP for Control Data. He kept the name "CDI", however it did not stand for anything.
- 1990 Mr. McKelvey took the company public, and changed the name to CDI College.
- 2003 It was subsequently sold to Corinthian Colleges, Inc., a large US based education company.
- 2007 Corinthian sold all the CDIs in Canada outside of Ontario to Vancouver-based Eminata Group. The CDIs in Ontario were renamed Everest College, which was the Corinthian brand. Eminata Group also operates Vancouver Career College, University Canada West and several other small schools. They are in the process of re-establishing a CDI brand in Ontario.
