= Network Systems Corporation =

- Founded: 1974
- Founder: James E. Thornton; Peter D. Jones
- Defunct: September 20, 1995
- Fate: merged with StorageTek
- Headquarters: Brooklyn Park, United States of America

Network Systems Corporation (NSC) was an early manufacturer of high-performance computer networking products. Founded in 1974, NSC produced hardware products that connected IBM and Control Data Corporation (CDC) mainframe computers to peripherals at remote locations. NSC also developed and commercialized the HYPERchannel networking system and protocol standards, adopted by Cray Research, Tektronix and others. In the late 1980s, NSC extended HYPERchannel to support the TCP/IP networking protocol and released a product allowing HYPERchannel devices to connect to the emerging Internet.

== History ==
The company was formed by former Control Data Corporation employees, James E. Thornton and Peter D. Jones in 1974. Initially based in Saint Paul, Minnesota the company moved to Brooklyn Park, Minnesota after delivering its first high-speed networking computers to the NSA. It merged with Storage Technology Corporation on September 20, 1995. Storage Technology Corporation was purchased by Sun Microsystems during the summer of 2005. Sun Microsystems was purchased by Oracle Corporation on April 20, 2009.

In the late 1980s, after enjoying great success in the mainframe computer market, NSC released its first product supporting the TCP/IP protocol, allowing customers to connect their mainframe computers to their emerging TCP/IP-based corporate and research networks. The market was shifting:

- Companies like Sun Microsystems and Apollo Computer had gained momentum showing the efficiency of distributed clusters of smaller workstations connected to a local area network.
- Internetworking companies, most notably Cisco Systems, entered the market with local and wide-area networking products using off-the-shelf components and custom software.
- Prices for workstations, networking infrastructure and routers plummeted.

NSC found itself in a strange position. Its HYPERchannel networking gear was being supplanted by cheaper and relatively plug-and-play LANs. In addition, the rapid evolution of routing protocols and software was not suited to its products which could neither be upgraded by the customer, nor booted from a server elsewhere on the network. In general, NSC products were maintained on-site by NSC technicians.

The company attempted to respond to market demands in 1991 by merging with Vitalink Communications Corporation, primarily a bridge manufacturer. Vitalink was well entrenched in the LAN/Network industry, however, bridges and issues with large Spanning-Tree domains were allowing the router manufacturers to gain position. Vitalink had a very good router running SPF, the predecessor to OSPF. Eventually, this nifty router proved to be too little, too late. Vitalink was the "bridge company" while Cisco, Wellfleet, Proteon, and others were the router companies.

In November 1993 NSC acquired the Boston-based Bytex Corp., a developer and manufacturer of WAN and LAN network switching system products including FDDI, Token Ring, and Ethernet adapters and switches.

By 1995, NSC could not adapt to changing market conditions and merged with StorageTek.

== Products ==
- AT10 HyperChannel Coax transceiver
- ACT10 HYPERChannel Coax transceiver
- A110 HYPERchannel Adapter for Control Data Corporation systems
- A120 HYPERchannel Adapter for Control Data Cyber 720/730 systems
- A130 HYPERchannel Adapter for Cray low-speed channels (LSP4).
- A140 Sperry Univac adapter
- A160 Burroughs
- A161 Honeywell
- A220 HYPERchannel Adapter for IBM Block Multiplexer Channels
- A240 ICL adapter
- A300 HYPERchannel Adapter for UNISYS systems
- A400 HYPERchannel Adapter for VMEbus workstations
- A510 IBM remote device support
- A515 IBM device support (newer version of A510)
- A710 link adapter
- AC715 series link adapter (uses ACT 10)
- A720 Satellite Adapter
- DX Series HYPERchannel Adapters (2nd generation) for all types of mainframes & minicomputers (e.g. IBM, UNISYS, Stratus, Sun, Tandem, DEC, etc.)
- DXE Series HYPERchannel Adapters (3rd generation) for all types of mainframes & minicomputers (e.g. IBM, UNISYS, Stratus, Sun, Tandem, DEC, etc.)
- EN641 Internet Protocol Router: This product connected HYPERchannel devices to Ethernet-based TCP/IP networks, acting as an inter-network router. It supported simple routing protocols through the use of the public-domain gated routing daemon and was based on an early version of BSD Unix adapted to run as an embedded system.
- NB130 HYPERchannel Card for connecting Cray systems. Configurable card for DX Series HYPERchannel Adapters
- NB220 HYPERchannel Card for IBM streaming-block-multiplexers. Configurable card for DX Series HYPERchannel Adapters
- ERS - Enterprise Routing Switch (aka Nortel Passport). Today's Nortel Passport 20K/15K/7K series being the result of the IP technology devised by NSC.
- NetSentry - Software Firewall product for NSC ERS/Nortel Passport based on NSC's BCF (Bridge Control Filter) and PCF (Packet Control Filter) software products.
