= Computer Peripherals =

Former printer manufacturer

Computer Peripherals, Inc.
- Company type: Private
- Predecessor: Holley Computer Products
- Founded: 1964
- Defunct: 1982
- Fate: Merged
- Successor: Centronics
- Headquarters: Rochester, Michigan, United States
- Products: Printers
- Parent: Control Data Corporation

Computer Peripherals, Inc. (CPI) was an American manufacturer of computer printers, based in Rochester, Michigan.

CPI's precursor, Holley Computer Products, was formed as a joint venture between Control Data Corporation (CDC) and the Holley Carburetor Company in April 1962. Holley developed and produced a series of drum printers. In June 1964, CDC bought out Holley and partnered with NCR and ICL to form CPI in Rochester. The facility was located near Rochester Road and Tienken Road, immediately north of North Hill Elementary School.

In the early 1970s CPI also had a branch in Valley Forge, Pennsylvania. This division made punched card readers and 9-track magnetic tape drives for both parent companies (CDC and NCR).

In 1978 CDC bought controlling interest of CPI. CPI produced several train printers under the CDC and Fastrain brands, including the CDC Model 512 (1967), the Fastrain A 1200 LPM (1969) and the Fastrain 9372-III 2000 LPM (1976).

In 1977, CPI began manufacturing printers at a factory in Stevenage, Herts, UK that was originally used for the manufacture of ICL1900 computers. By 1979, the factory also made 9-track tape drives which were used in ICL and CDC computers, and were sold with industry-standard interfaces for use with other manufacturer's computers.

In 1982, CDC acquired a controlling interest in Centronics in exchange for CPI and $25 million in cash. CPI was merged into Centronics and eventually the Rochester facility was closed.
