= Howard Engstrom =

American computer scientist

Howard T. Engstrom
- Born: April 23, 1902; Boston, MA
- Died: March 8, 1962 (aged 59); Carney Hospital, Boston, MA
- Occupations: mathematics professor, Navy commander
- Spouse: Karin Ekblum
- Children: Mrs. William Agosta (daughter), Anna (daughter), Morton (son)
- Awards: Distinguished Service Medal (United States Navy), Order of the British Empire, Naval Reserve Medal, Presidential Unit Citation.

Howard T. Engstrom (1902 – 1962) was a Yale University mathematics professor and headed research operations at the United States Navy's Communication Supplementary Activities CSAW during World War II. Along with William Norris and others he founded Engineering Research Associates in 1946. He was one of the co-creators of the Univac computer, and served as deputy director of the National Security Agency.

== Education ==
Engstrom graduated with a bachelor's degree in chemical engineering from Northeastern University in 1925, and received a master's from the University of Maine in 1922, where he also worked as a mathematics instructor. He was announced as an instructor of mathematics at Yale in 1927, received his PhD from Yale in 1929, and was promoted to associate professor in 1941.

Engstrom "was a national research fellow at the California Institute of Technology in 1930 and an international research fellow at Göttingen, Germany, in 1931". He was also a "fellow of the Institute of Radio Engineers and of Davenport College".

== Military and professional career ==
Engstrom resigned from Yale to enter military service in 1941. He attained the rank of captain in the Navy and was awarded the Distinguished Service Medal (United States Navy), the Order of the British Empire, the Naval Reserve Medal, and a Presidential Unit Citation.

Engstrom served as vice president and director of marketing of scientific systems for Sperry Rand's Remington Rand Univac division from 1952 to 1956, and co-created the Univac.

Engstrom served at the National Security Agency for two years, beginning in October, 1956. Upon his departure, Secretary of Defense Neil H. McElroy cited him for "exceptional meritorious civilian service" in directing the agency's research program.

== Death ==
Engstrom died at the age of 59 after suffering a months-long illness.
