= Engineering Research Associates =

Pioneering American computer firm (1946–1952)

- Industry: Technology
- Founded: 1946; 80 years ago
- Founders: William Norris, Howard Engstrom
- Defunct: 1952
- Fate: Purchased by Remington Rand
- Products: Computers

Engineering Research Associates, commonly known as ERA, was a pioneering computer firm from the 1950s. ERA became famous for their numerical computers, but as the market expanded they became better known for their drum memory systems. They were eventually purchased by Remington Rand and merged into their UNIVAC department. Many of the company founders later left to form Control Data Corporation.

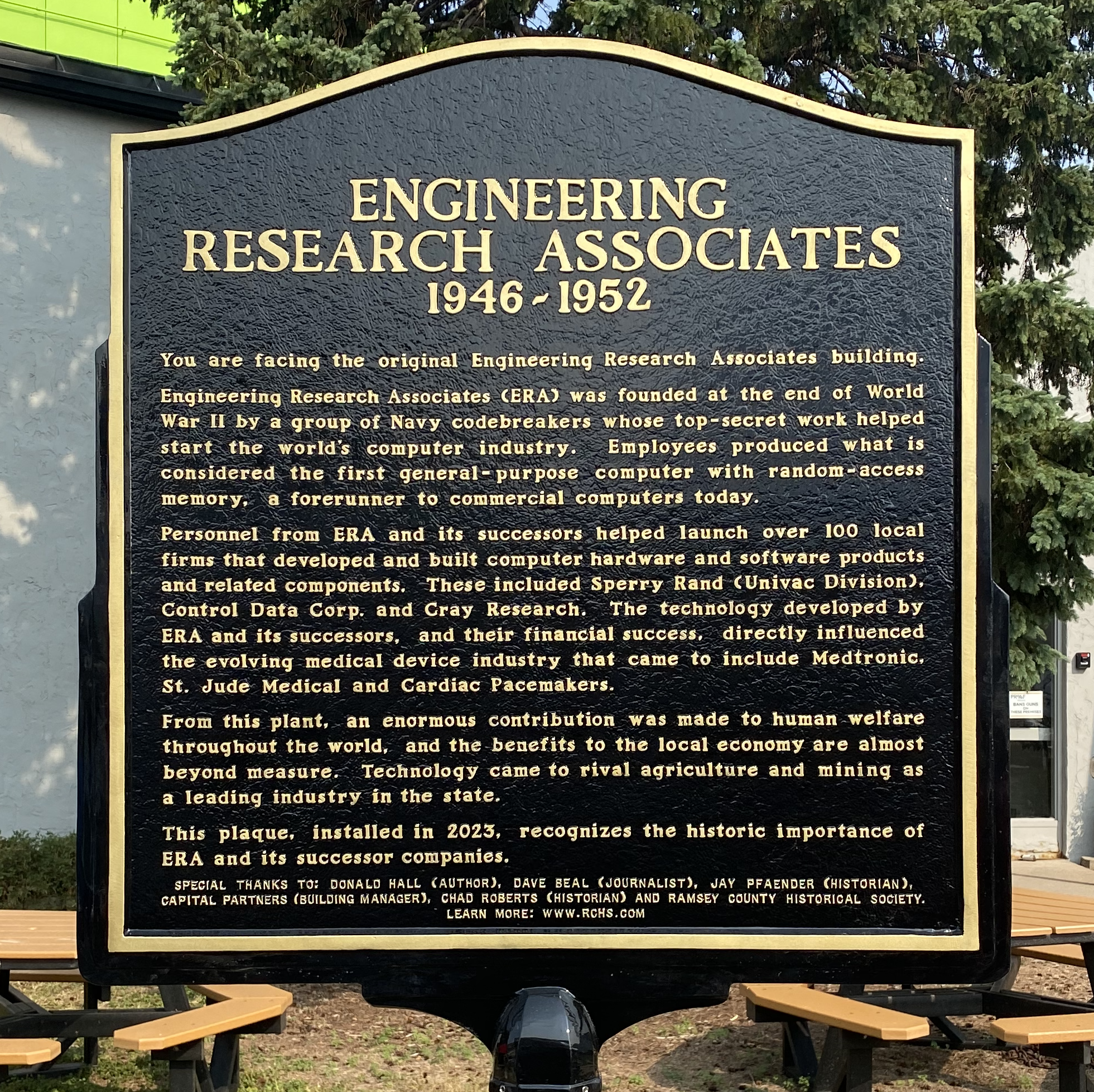
ERA Memorial Plaque, installed 2023-06-15, Ramsey County Historical Society

== Wartime origins of ERA ==
The ERA team started as a group of scientists and engineers working for the US Navy during WWII on code-breaking, a division known as the Communications Supplementary Activity - Washington (CSAW). After the war, budgets were cut for most military projects, including CSAW. Joseph Wenger of the Navy's cryptoanalytic group was particularly worried that the CSAW team would spread to various companies and the Navy would lose their ability to quickly design new machines.

== Post-war organization ==
Wenger and two members of the CSAW team, William Norris and Howard Engstrom, started looking for investors interested in supporting the development of a new computer company. Their only real lead, at Kuhn, Loeb & Co., eventually fell through.

They then met John Parker, an investment banker who had run Northwest Aeronautical Corporation (NAC), a glider subsidiary of Chase Aircraft, in St. Paul, Minnesota. NAC was in the process of shutting down as the war ended most contracts, and Parker was looking for new projects to keep the factory running. He was told nothing about the work the team would do, but after being visited by a series of increasingly high-ranking naval officers culminating with James Forrestal, he knew "something" was up and decided to give it a try. Norris, Engstrom, and their group incorporated ERA in January, 1946, hired forty of their codebreaking colleagues, and moved to the NAC factory.

During the early years, the company took on any engineering work that came their way, but were generally kept in business developing new code-breaking machines for the Navy. Most of the machines were custom-built to crack a specific code, and increasingly used magnetic drum memory to process and analyze the coded texts. To ensure secrecy, the factory was declared to be a Navy Reserve base, and armed guards were posted at the entrance. ERA's numerous military and intelligence projects contributed to Minnesota's becoming "the Land of 10,000 Top-Secret Computer Projects."

== Goldberg and Demon codebreakers ==
Their first machine, Goldberg, completed in 1947, used a crude drum made by gluing magnetic tape to the surface of a large metal cylinder that could be spun at 50 RPM for reading (and much slower for writing). Over the next few years, the drum memory systems increased in capacity and speed, along with the paper tape readers needed to feed the data onto the drums. They later ended up in a major patent fight with Technitrol Engineering, who introduced a drum memory of their own in 1952.

One of the follow-on machines, Demon, was built to crack a specific Soviet code. In 1949 the code was changed, rendering the machine useless. James Pendergrass, a Navy officer attached to the codebreaking unit, had attended a series of lectures at the Moore School of Engineering at the University of Pennsylvania in 1946, and became convinced the only lasting solution to the code breaking problem was a computer that could be quickly re-programmed to work on different tasks. In 1947 the Navy awarded ERA a contract, "Task 13", to develop what was destined to be the first stored program computer in the U.S. The machine, known as the Atlas, used drum memory and was delivered in 1950. ERA then started to sell it commercially as the ERA 1101, 1101 being binary for 13. Even before delivery of the Atlas, the Navy asked for a more powerful machine using both Williams tubes and drum memory, a machine known as the Atlas II. Work began in 1950 and the completed Atlas II was delivered to the still-secret NSA in September 1953.

== High-speed Computing Devices ==
In 1950, ERA published High-speed Computing Devices, a 450-page textbook that summarized the state of computer technology at that time. It describes the basic components of digital logic, the devices and circuits used to build these components, and the principles of computer design and programming. This book was a revision of a report submitted to the Office of Naval Research, omitting references to cryptography; Mina Rees, then director of the ONR mathematical section, suggested that it should be published.

One of the book's most successful predictions concerned the transistor, which had recently been invented at Bell Laboratories: "It will probably be competitive with the electron tube in total cost per stage." (page 423)

== Legal troubles and the Remington Rand acquisition ==
ERA looked to selling similar machines to a number of customers, but at about this time they became embroiled in a lengthy series of political maneuvering in Washington. Drew Pearson's Washington Merry-Go-Round claimed that the founding of ERA was a conflict of interest for Norris and Engstrom because they had used their war-time government connections to set up a company for their own profit. The resulting legal fight left the company drained, both financially and emotionally. In 1952 they were purchased by Remington Rand, largely as a result of these problems.

Remington Rand already had a computing division however, after they had purchased the Eckert–Mauchly Computer Corporation in 1950. For a time the two companies operated as independent units within Remington, with ERA focusing on scientific and military customers, while Eckert–Mauchly's UNIVACs were sold to business customers. However, in 1955 Remington merged with Sperry Corporation to become Sperry Rand. Both ERA and Eckert–Mauchly were folded into a single division as Sperry-UNIVAC. Much of ERA's work was dropped, while their drum technology was used in newer UNIVAC machines. A number of employees were not happy with this move and decamped to form Control Data Corporation under the leadership of Norris. Among them was Seymour Cray, who went on to design supercomputers and create Cray Computers.

But the core of the ERA team lived on. Eventually they were moved to a new research division where they had considerably more freedom. They worked primarily on computing systems for military use, and they pioneered a number of early command and control and guidance systems for ICBMs and satellites. There they were known as the Military Division, which was later renamed the Aerospace Division.

== The new ERA ==
In the late 1970s, a few Sperry-Rand employees, including Paul Arnone, Paul Weinschel, and Dominic Carducci, purchased the ERA name and started a small Dept of Defense contracting firm in Tysons Corner, Virginia. In 1989, the new ERA became a wholly owned subsidiary of E-Systems. In 1995 it was merged into the Melpar division of its parent, and the name once again disappeared.
