= Holley Performance Products =

American automotive aftermarket company

- Type: Public company
- Traded as: HLLY
- Industry: Automotive aftermarket
- Founded: Bradford, Pennsylvania, in 1896
- Founders: George Holley and Earl Holley
- Headquarters: Bowling Green, Kentucky, United States
- Key people: Matt Stevenson (President and CEO)
- Brands: ACCEL, ADS Racing Shocks, AEM, AEM EV, Amp'd, Anvil Off-Road, APR, B&M, Baer Brakes, Brawler, Bright Earth, Carroll Shelby Wheels, CataClean, Classic Instruments, Demon, Detroit Speed, DiabloSport, Dinan, Earl's, Edge, Fender Gripper, Flowmaster, Flowmonster, Flowtech Exhaust, Frostbite Cooling, GearFX Driveline, Halibrand, HANS, Hays, Hilborn, HK Wheels, Holley Classic Trucks, Holley EFI, Holley iNTECH, Holley RetroBright, Hooker, Hooker Blackheart, Hurst, Lakewood, Legendary Wheels, Mallory, Mr. Gasket, MSD, MSD Atomic, MSD Dynaforce, NOS, OG Innovations, ProConnect, Proforged, Pulsar, Quick Fuel Technology, Quick Time, Racepak, RaceQuip, Range Technology, REKUDO, REV Wheels, Rocket Racing Wheels, Simpson Racing, Sniper, SPAL Fans, Speartech, Stilo, Street Fire, STS Turbo, Superchips, Weiand, White Box, XDR
- Parent: Sentinel Capital Partners
- Website: holley.com

Holley Performance Products is an automotive performance company based in Bowling Green, Kentucky. It was founded in 1896 in Bradford, Pennsylvania, by George Holley and Earl Holley. When the company was based in Michigan it was a major producer of carburetors for many Detroit-built automobiles.

Later they manufactured carburetors for both street and racing applications. Carbeurator types such as the Holley "Double Pumper" and "Dominator" were synonymous with the company. Holley-style carburetors powered every NASCAR Sprint Cup team and every NHRA Pro Stock champion until both series eventually switched to electronic fuel injection (EFI). NASCAR Sprint Cup engines still utilize a Holley throttle body and Holley EFI is the spec EFI system in NHRA Pro Stock. Holley's product range has expanded to include the aforementioned fuel injection systems, performance fuel pumps, intake manifolds, superchargers, nitrous oxide injection, performance plumbing parts, exhaust systems, engine dress–up products, ignition products, data-logging and display products, handheld programmers, bellhousings, and clutches for street performance, race, and marine applications. Among the company's owned divisions are brand names MSD Performance, Flowmaster, Hurst, Nitrous Oxide Systems (NOS), Weiand, Flowtech, Earl's Performance Plumbing, Hooker Headers, Demon Carburetion, Racepak, Superchips, Diablosport, Edge Products, Accel Ignition, Quick Time, Hays Clutches, Mr. Gasket, Lakewood, Mallory Ignition, B&M, APR and Dinan.

== History ==
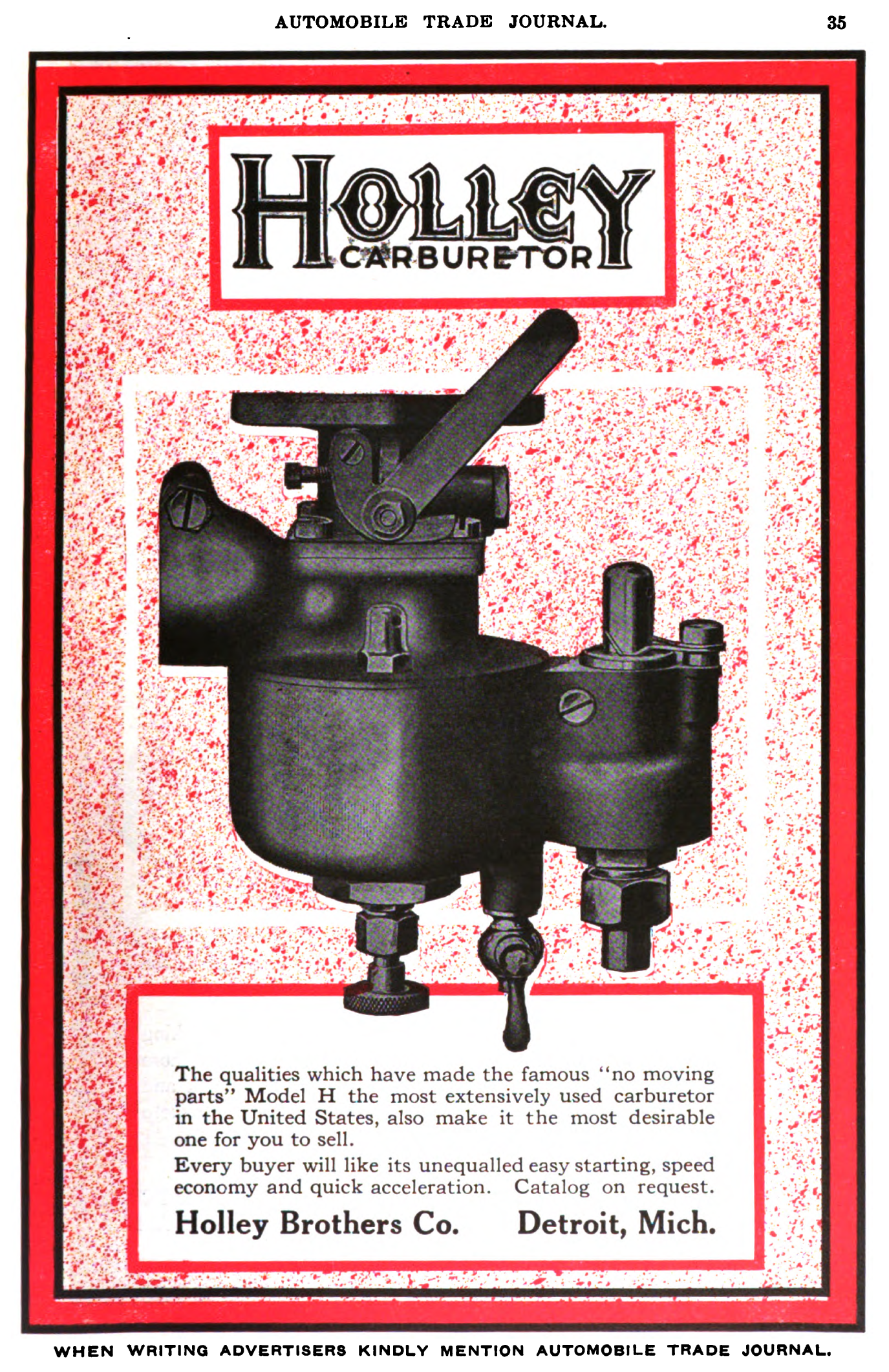
Holley Brothers Company advertisement for carburetors in the Automobile Trade Journal, 1916.

Holley's history starts in Bradford, Pennsylvania, in 1896 when teenage brothers George (1878–1963) and Earl Holley built a small, one-cylinder, three-wheeled vehicle they dubbed the "Runabout", with a top speed of 30 mph. At the eve of the era of motorcars, the brothers decided to start the Holley Motor Company, and produced one four-wheeled model: "The Holley brothers built their first marketable automobile in 1902. They called it the Holley Motorette and it sold for $550. More than 600 were produced." The company today marks its official starting date as 1903 when they started mass-producing carburetors for Henry Ford.

"Their first original carburetor, called the iron pot, appeared on the curved-dash Oldsmobile in 1904." In April 1905 Holley Brothers Company was established with an address at 661-75 Beaubien St., Detroit, Michigan. The brothers then concentrated on the manufacturing of carburetors and ignition systems. As a result of the Motorette Henry Ford commissioned the brothers to produce a carburetor for his Model T. "The carburetor they built for Ford was an immediate success and the brothers founded Holley Carburetor Co., which became one of Ford's biggest suppliers."

In 1913 George Holley made a tour of Germany to study manufacturing methods, accompanied by Henry M. Leland, when it was said that a Holley carburetor: "was on more than one-half of the automobiles sent out from American factories this year."

In 1925 a Holley employee, Daniel H. Meloche, was awarded the Edward Longstreth Medal by the Franklin Institute of Philadelphia. He had invented an improved refractory coating for casting molds, allowing permanent iron molds to make gray iron castings over many cycles, whereas earlier iron molds were quickly consumed when casting iron. The process employing long-life molds was leased to the River Rouge plant of the Ford Motor Company, the Harrison Radiator Corporation, and the plant of Ludwig, Loewe & Co., of Berlin.

In 1929 the Los Angeles Times reported that George M. Holley of Pasadena and Detroit and a director of the Aviation Corporation of Delaware, has been elected a director of the Bach Aircraft Corporation. Holley, while serving as president of the Holley Carburetor Company, was also a director of National Air Transport, Kinner Airplane and Motor, Stinson Aircraft of Detroit, Air Investors Inc., Towie Aircraft Company of Detroit, and one of the original stockholders of Western Air Express Inc. In 1931 Holley became a director of the Warner Aircraft Corporation.

In 1952 Holley closed a plant at Portland, Michigan, which moved to Bowling Green, Kentucky. That year Holley produced the Visi-flo carburetor, with a glass inspection window to make a visual check of the fuel level, sediment, flooding and float action. The glass fuel bowl was manufactured by the Lancaster Lens company of Lancaster, Ohio. In 1955 the Wall Street Journal reported: "Bowling Green Manufacturing Co., a subsidiary of Holley Carburetor Co., each year sends its employees dummy "checks" made out for the amount each employee has received indirectly through fringe benefits."

In 1968 the Plain Dealer reported: "Colt Industries Inc. has acquired Holley Carburetor Co., of Warren, Michigan, following approval by directors of both companies. Holley Carburetor which makes auto ignition systems and aviation fuel controls, employs about 3,000 at four facilities in three states." At this time the corporate, engineering and sales headquarters were in Warren, Michigan, with plants in Bowling Green, Kentucky; Paris, Tennessee, and Clare, Michigan. Holley was said to have a turnover of $40 million in 1967. At the time of the sale the company was primarily owned by members of the Holley family.

In 1974 Holley was making carburetors for Ford and some under its own name at Paris, Tennessee. "Significant facilities expansions were initiated in 1979 at Water Valley, Mississippi to meet carburetor requirements for the new Ford Motor Company four-cylinder car, code named Erika, and in Bowling Green, Kentucky; Paris, Tennessee and Sallisaw, Oklahoma." In 1993 Coltec Industries Inc., of New York, at the time parent of Holley, closed the administrative offices at Warren, Michigan, and a warehouse at Goodlettsville, Tennessee. These functions were moved to Bowling Green, Kentucky.

Holley continued its dominance in racing, powering all winning NHRA Pro Stock racers and all NASCAR Sprint Cup Series teams. The 1980s also saw Holley's entrance into the fuel injection market where OEM EFI components and analog Pro-Jection retrofit fuel-injection systems for carbureted cars were introduced.

In the early 1990s Holley continued new product introductions with the HP Pro Series race-ready carburetors. During this time Holley also introduced SysteMAX® engine kits that included matched cylinder heads, intakes and cams. The Dominator also evolved in the 1990s into the HP Dominator; huge billet electric fuel pumps were introduced, and retrofit EFI kits evolved into digital Pro-Jection 4D and 4Di.

In 1998 Coltec Industries sold Holley Performance for $100 million to a management-led team backed by Kohlberg & Co., L.L.C.

In 1999, after becoming independent of Coltec Industries, the management team purchased a number of other aftermarket companies in an effort to provide a "full package" to their customers/dealers. These companies include: Weiand (intake manifolds and superchargers), B&M's supercharger division, Hooker Headers, Earl's Performance Plumbing, Flow Tech exhaust, Lunati (camshafts, crankshafts, pistons and connecting rods), NOS (Nitrous Oxide Systems, Inc), and So-Cal Speed Shop, as well as a few ancillary companies.

In 2000, Holley leased a facility in Aberdeen, Mississippi, with a plan to centralize five existing plants in the U.S., Mexico and Canada.

In 2010 Holley created the LS Fest, a show, race and celebration of vehicles that utilize a GM LSV8 engine. The LS-Fest has a variety of bracket racing, engine swap, braking, autocross, show & shine and other events that attracted large crowds and participants to the show's venue September 10–12, 2010, at Beech Bend Raceway in Bowling Green, KY. The LS Fest has been held in September of every year since.

2013 marked Holley's 110th anniversary.

On December 8, 2014, Holley acquired DiabloSport Inc.

On September 22, 2015, Holley acquired MSD Group, which includes brands MSD, Mr. Gasket, Lakewood, Accel, Mallory, Hays, and SuperChips.

On March 12, 2021, Holley announced they had entered into a definitive merger agreement with special purpose acquisition company Empower Ltd (Tkr: EMPW) that will result in Holley becoming a publicly listed company on the NYSE under the new ticker symbol “HLLY”.

On February 6, 2023, Tom Tomlinson stepped down from his position as President and CEO. Board Director, Michelle Gloeckler, was appointed as Interim President and CEO while the company looks to replace her with a permanent CEO.

On May 17, 2023, It was announced that Matt Stevenson of the Blue Bird Corporation will be appointed as the new Chief Executive Officer starting on June 6, 2023. He said, “I look forward to the road ahead with Holley and the opportunity to build something great with the team. I have already seen the excitement everyone has about the company and as an enthusiast myself, I can’t wait to get to work.”

== Standard equipment on modern race cars ==
2011 - NASCAR decides to switch from carburetors to fuel injection systems for the 2012 Sprint Cup racing season. Holley's billet aluminum throttle bodies were selected in conjunction with a McLaren Electronic Systems and Freescale Semiconductor.

2012 - Holley Hi-Ram intake manifold becomes standard equipment on GM COPO Camaros equipped with the LS7 aluminum block.

2012 - Holley's Earl's Performance Plumbing brand transmission coolers become standard equipment on GM COPO Camaros.

2013 - Holley HP EFI engine control unit (ECU) became standard equipment used on all of Chevrolet Performance's COPO Camaro factory-built race cars.

2015 - Holley HP EFI engine control unit (ECU) became optional equipment used in conjunction with the Ilmor 396 engine package which is legal for use in the ARCA racing series.

2016 - Holley HP EFI engine control unit (ECU) became standard equipment used on all cars in the NHRA's Pro Stock class, the world premier class for naturally aspirated drag cars.

2018 - Holley HP EFI engine control unit (ECU) became standard equipment on the optional NT1 engine which is legal for use in NASCAR Truck Series racing.

== Ownership history ==
In 1968, Colt Industries Inc. acquired Holley from the Holley family.

In 1998, Coltec Industries sold Holley Performance to a management-led team backed by Kohlberg & Co., L.L.C.

As of February 12, 2008, Holley filed for bankruptcy. The 2008 bankruptcy led Holley to transfer its equity to holders of $95 million in second-lien debt. During 2009 Holley closed a plant at Tijuana, Mexico, that made Hooker Headers, and transferred the work to Aberdeen, Mississippi. As of September 28, 2009, Holley filed for bankruptcy Chapter 11 protection.

Effective June 22, 2010, Holley emerged from bankruptcy protection.

In 2012, the private equity firm Monomoy Capital Partners acquired Holley Performance Products.

In 2013, Monomoy Capital Partners sold Holley to Lincolnshire Equity Fund IV, L.P.

In 2015, Holley acquired the MSD Group which includes MSD Performance, Mr. Gasket, Accel, Superchips, Edge, Racepak, Mallory, Hays, QuickTime, and Lakewood.

in 2018, Lincolnshire Equity IV, L.P. sold Holley to Sentinel Capital Partners who merged the company with its Driven Performance Brands

== See also ==
- BorgWarner
- Computer Peripherals Inc
