= Dayforce =

American technology company

Dayforce, Inc.
- Formerly: Ceridian HCM Holding Inc.
- Type: Private
- Industry: SaaS HCM Software
- Predecessor: Control Data Corporation
- Founded: 1992; 34 years ago
- Headquarters: Minneapolis, Minnesota, U.S.
- Key people: David Ossip (CEO)
- Revenue: increase}} US$1.76 billion (2024)
- Operating income: ▼US$104 million (2024)
- Net income: ▼US$18.1 million (2024)
- Total assets: ▲US$9.12 billion (2024)
- Total equity: ▲US$2.55 billion (2024)
- Owner: Thoma Bravo
- Number of employees: 9,600 (2024)
- Website: dayforce.com

Dayforce, Inc., formerly Ceridian, is an American human resources software and services company.

Dayforce is also the name of its cloud human capital management (HCM) platform, which covers the full suite of human capital management software, including payroll, tax filing, benefits, HR, talent intelligence, workforce management, and recruiting technology.

It was publicly listed on the New York Stock Exchange and the Toronto Stock Exchange until February 2026, when the investment firm Thoma Bravo completed the purchase of the company for approximately US$12.3 billion.

== History ==
Dayforce is a descendant of Control Data Corporation, founded in 1992 as an information services firm established from the restructuring of a computer manufacturing and services company founded in 1957 that had the same name. The computer product business was spun off as Control Data Systems.

In March 2001, Ceridian was split into two independent companies, with the "old" Ceridian Corporation changed its name to Arbitron and the rest of the company (consisting of human resources services and Comdata business) took the Ceridian name.

In 2007, Ceridian was acquired for US$5.3 billion by Thomas H. Lee Partners and Fidelity National Financial (FNF). Ceridian common stock ceased trading on the NYSE before commencement of trading on November 9, 2007 and was delisted from the NYSE.

In March 2012, Ceridian completed its acquisition of Dayforce, a single SaaS application for HR, payroll, tax, benefits, workforce management, talent management, and several related activities.

On October 1, 2013, it completed the legal separation of its Human Capital Management and payments businesses through a series of transactions. This resulted in the payments business operating as Comdata Inc. (“Comdata”) and the HCM business as Ceridian HCM Holding Inc. (“Ceridian HCM”).

In April 2018, Ceridian went public in an initial offering that raised over $400 million. In September 2019, it acquired Australia-based enterprise HR software company Riteq.

On March 1, 2021, almost a year after acquiring an Asian HCM (Excelity Global Solutions), Ceridian completed the acquisition of Ascender HCM. On December 3, the firm acquired the US-based ADAM Human Capital Management which was a leading provider of payroll and HCM software and services for 33 countries in the Latin American, Brazilian, and Caribbean markets.

Ceridian HCM Holding Inc. changed its corporate name to Dayforce, Inc. on January 31, 2024. The company began using the Dayforce brand and trading under the ticker symbol DAY on February 1, 2024. That same day, Dayforce completed its acquisition of eloomi, a learning experience platform software provider based in Copenhagen, Denmark, and Orlando, Florida.

In August 2025, private equity firm Thoma Bravo agreed to acquire Dayforce in a $12.3 billion deal that also included a significant minority investment from the Abu Dhabi Investment Authority. The transaction was completed on February 4, 2026.

== Leadership ==
- David Ossip, Chairman and Chief Executive Officer (2013–present)
