= Control Data Corporation =

American mainframe and supercomputer firm (1957–1999)

- Industry: Supercomputing
- Founded: 1957; 69 years ago
- Defunct: 1999
- Fate: Broken up
- Successor: Ceridian (later Dayforce, Inc.)
- Headquarters: Bloomington, Minnesota, U.S.
- Key people: Seymour Cray, William Norris

Control Data Corporation (CDC) was a mainframe and supercomputer company that in the 1960s was one of the nine major U.S. computer companies, a group which included IBM, Burroughs Corporation, Digital Equipment Corporation (DEC), NCR Corporation (NCR), General Electric, Honeywell, RCA, and UNIVAC.

For most of the 1960s, CDC's strength was the design work of the electrical engineer Seymour Cray who developed a series of some of the fastest mainframes in the world. During the 1970s, Cray left CDC to found Cray Research (CRI) to manufacture supercomputers. In 1988, after much financial loss, CDC began withdrawing from mainframes and sold several of its affiliated companies.

In 1992, CDC went out of business after dividing its assets between two new companies, Ceridian and Control Data Systems, Inc. The remaining affiliate companies of CDC do business as the software company Dayforce.

== Background ==
=== Communications Supplementary Activity - Washington (CSAW) ===
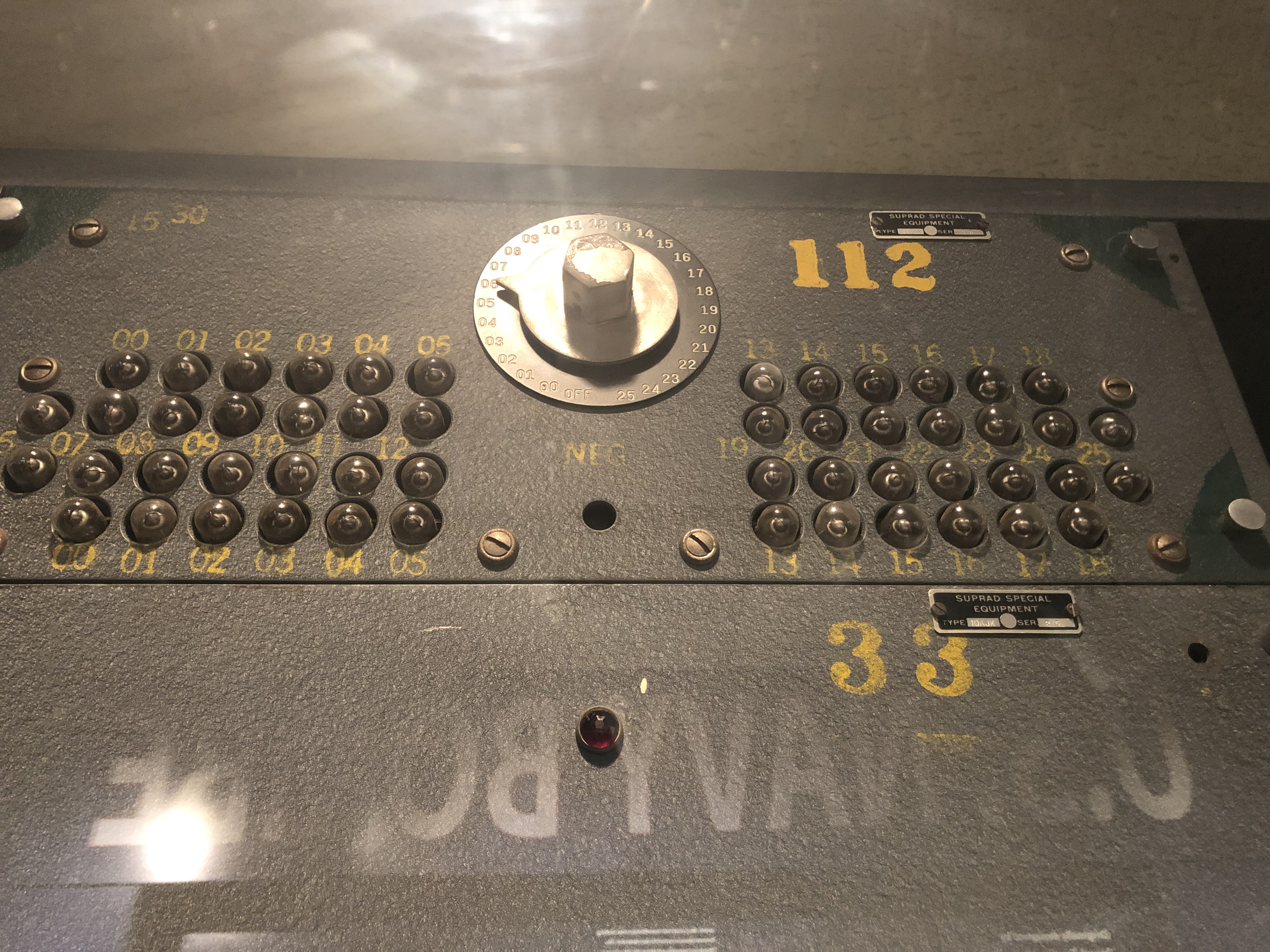
US Navy Cryptanalytic Bombe

During World War II, the U.S. Navy in 1942 assembled a team of engineers called Communications Supplementary Activity - Washington (CSAW). Their mission was to use code breaking machinery developed by NCR to decipher secret Japanese and German codes. Their main targets were German U-boats using the Enigma machine. The CSAW staff included the electrical engineer Seymour Cray and the cryptographer William Norris. These two men would be key figures in the establishment and growth of CDC.

When the war ended in 1945, NCR advised the Navy that it was ceasing production of code breaking equipment. However, the Navy needed to maintain its code breaking capabilities to face the new threat from the Soviet Union. Its problem was that the Navy could not match the pay that the CSAW team members could earn in the private sector, given the reduction in government defense spending. CSAW management then proposed that the Navy support the establishment of a private company to hire CSAW staff and building its own code breaking machines.

In 1946, the Navy approached John Parker, the owner of Northwestern Aeronautical Corporation in St. Paul, Minnesota. During the war, Parker had been making gliders for the US Army. Needing new business, Parker agreed to the arrangement. Parker would hire the CSAW team and pursue any business it wanted. For its secret Navy business, the Navy sent the Naval Computing Machine Laboratory (NCML) staff and code breaking equipment to the new company.

=== Engineering Research Associates ===
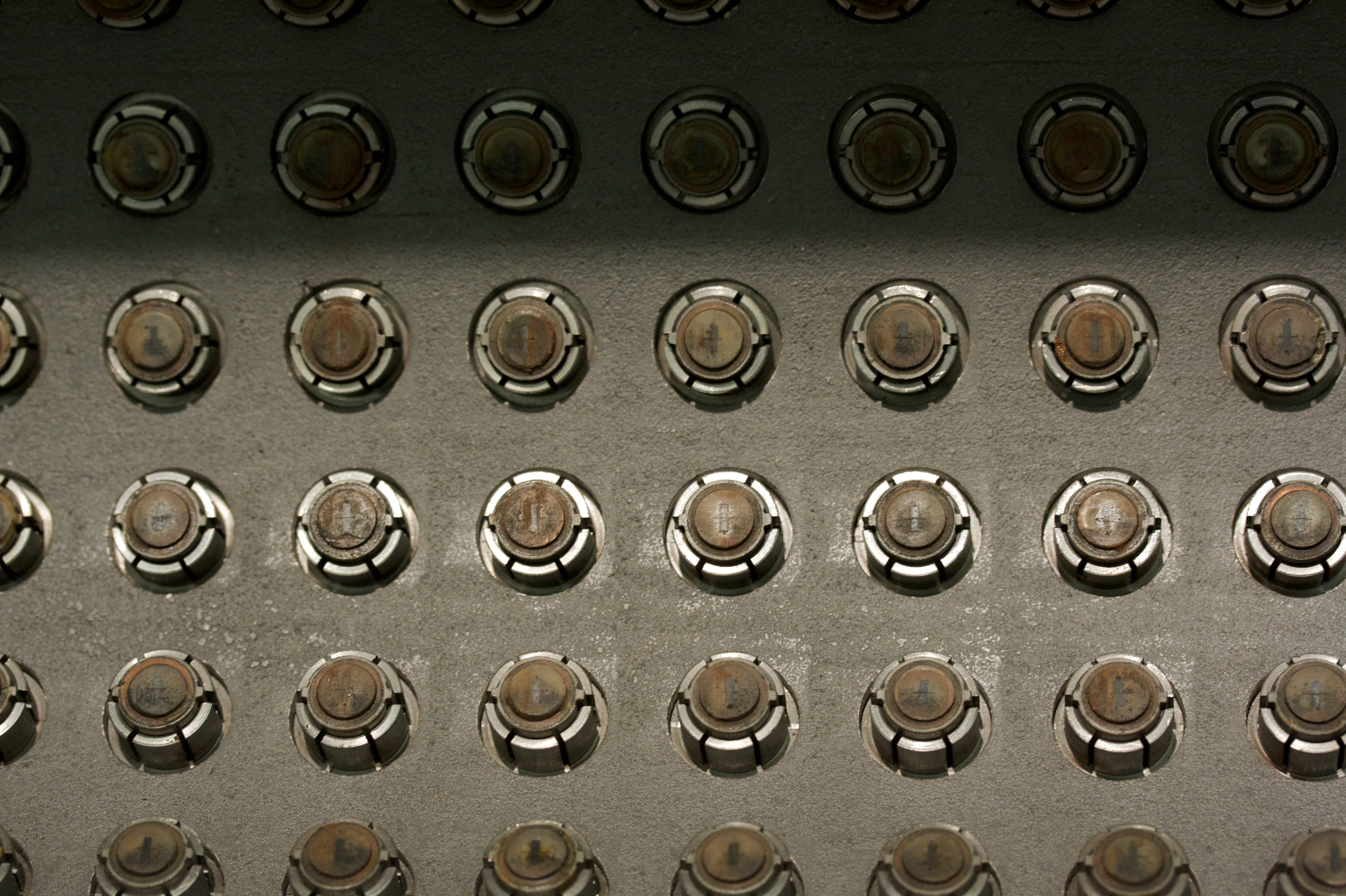
ERA magnetic drum memory

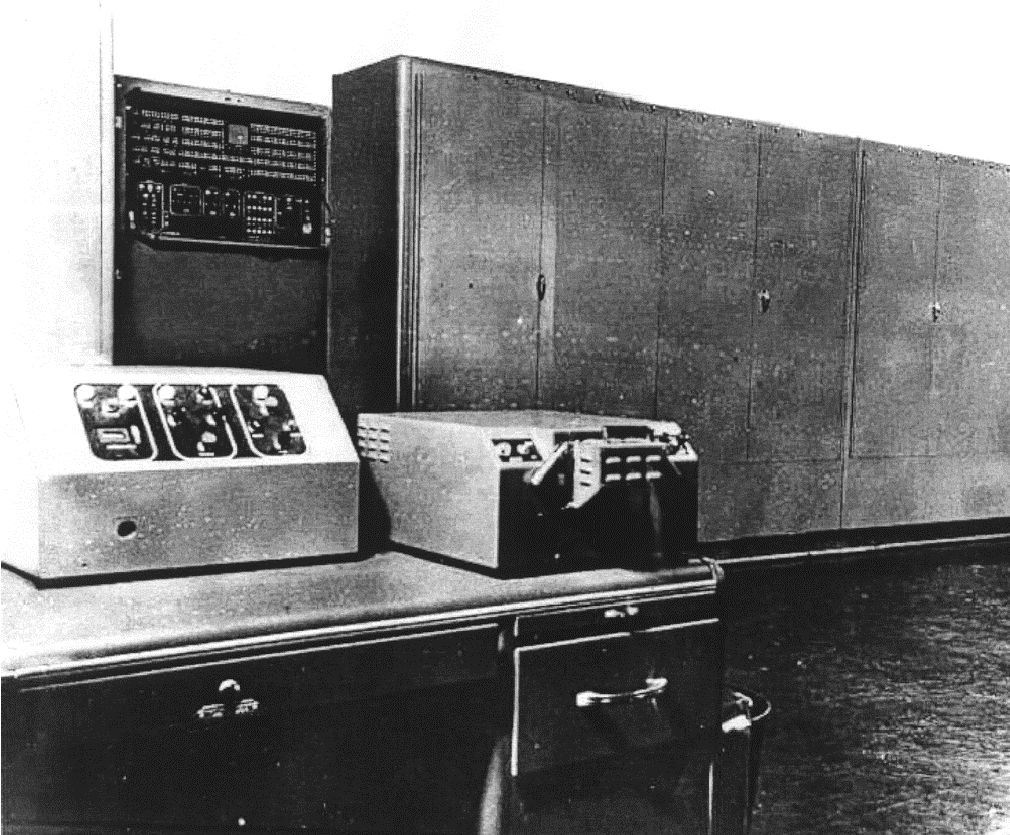
Atlas system (Univac 1101)

Parker formed Engineering Research Associates (ERA) in 1946, at the factory in St. Paul, Minnesota, leased from the government.Parker hired 40 workers from CSAW and received the loan of 20 naval personal from NCML.

Soon after its incorporation, the Navy asked ERA to investigate the storage of binary information on rotating magnetic drums. ERA created a magnetic drum by gluing magnetic recording tape to a cylinder. However, once data was uploaded on the drum, the operator could not change it without deleting everything. In 1948, ERA solved that problem, creating the first viable memory storage device for a computing system.

The Navy's top priority for ERA was the design of a general purpose computer that could store programs. Its previous code breaking machines required new hardware whenever an enemy changed its coding system, quickly making the expensive Navy equipment obsolete. A code breaking machine that could upload a new program as needed would mitigate that problem. The introduction of ENIAC and EDVAC, the first general-purpose mainframes, pushed the Navy into creating its own machine.

The Navy in 1948 gave ERA the confirmation to build a new, general purpose code breaking machine, code-named Atlas. The Navy intended to used the Atlas in their non-secret code-breaking centers. However, a controversy broke out in the US Congress about the Navy providing so many resources to a private company.

=== Remington Rand and Sperry Rand ===
Losing money during the protracted legal debate over ERA, Parker finally sold the company to Remington Rand Inc. in 1952. Remington Rand was the creator of the UNIVAC (UNIVersal Automatic Computer) computer. On election night of the 1952 US Presidential election, CBS News used a UNIVAC to predict the winner. The computer correctly predicted that General Dwight D. Eisenhower would easily defeat US Senator Adlai Stevenson II, contrary to experts who believed Stevenson would win.

After purchaing ERA, Remington Rand kept the ERA team separate from the UNIVAC developers. Rand was most interested in the magnetic drum memory systems that ERA had pioneered. By the mid-1950s, Remington Rand's initial leadership with Univac was being whittled away by IBM machines that used fewer vacuum tubes.In 1955, the Sperry Corporation bought Remington Rand, forming the Sperry Rand Corporation, headed by Retired General Douglas MacArthur. The new corporation combined the Univac and ERA teams into one division, with Norris as its leader.

At first, the ERA engineers provides support for a variety of projects. Eventually, ERA was assigned to the UNIVAC II Sperry Rand wanted to use the ERA Atlas as the basis of the Univac 1101 computer. Sperry Rand then developed three Univac 1102 units for the US Air Force. They were followed by the 36-bit UNIVAC 1103. The UNIVAC projects were plagued by lengthy delays and rivalries between the UNIVAC and ERA engineers.

== Birth of Control Data Corporation ==
In 1957, several ERA employees left Sperry Rand to form the Control Data Corporation (CDC). They were Robert Perkins, William R. Keye, Howard Shekel, Norris and Robert Kisch. The men moved into an old warehouse across the Mississippi River in Minneapolis.The partners elected Norris as chief executive officer of CDC. Cray also wanted to join the new venture. However, he stayed at Sperry Rand to complete a prototype for the M-460 Naval Tactical Data System (NTDS).

== CDC 1604 ==
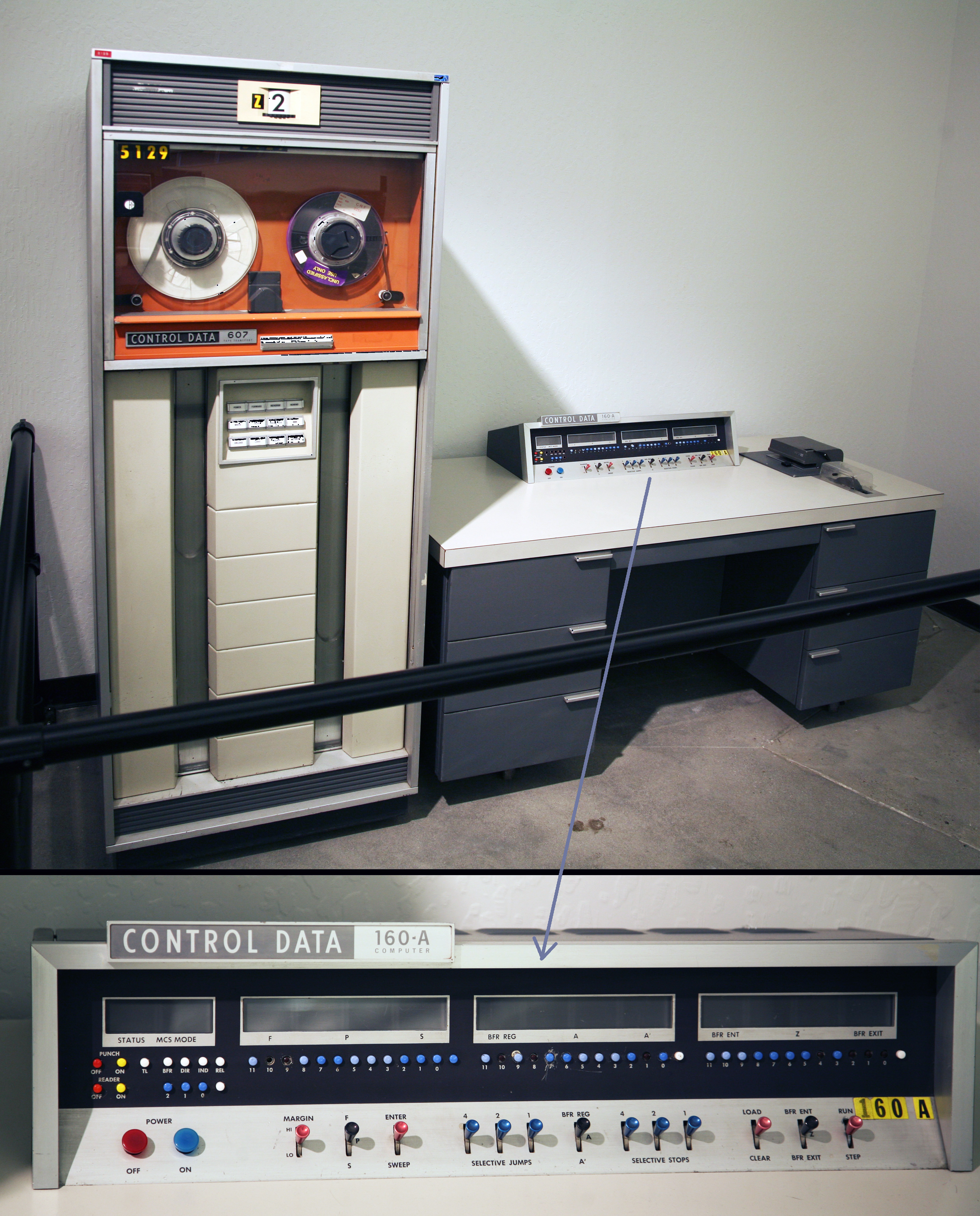
CDC 160 and 160-A

CDC started business in 1957 by selling computer subsystems, mostly drum memory systems, to other computer companies. When Cray finally joined CDC in 1958, he was named chief designer. His first project was a prototype known as the CDC Little Character. There was a small transistor-based 6-bit machine that Cray designed to test his ideas on large-system design and transistor-based machines.Cray then designed CDC's first mainframe, the CDC 1604.

In October 1959, CDC released the CDC 1604 computer. Unlike the UNIVAC1103, which used 3,900 vacuum tubes, the 1604 was fully transitorized.Using transistors instead of vacuum tubes, the CDC 1604 became the most powerful computer in world, far more reliable than its rivals with vacuum tubes. CDC delivered the first CDC 1604 to the Naval Postgraduate School in Monterey, California.

CDC in 1960 released the CDC 160A, a less expensive, 12-bit cut-down version of the CDC 1604. This system is often considered to be one of the first minicomputers. The 160A was built as a standard office desktop, an unusual packaging for that era. In 1964, CDC introduced the CDC 3000 mainframe series, containing new versions of the basic CDC 1604 architecture.

Cray immediately turned to the design of a machine that would be the fastest (or in the terminology of the day, largest) machine in the world, setting the goal at 50 times the speed of the CDC 1604. This required radical changes in design, and as the project "dragged on" — it had gone on for about four years by then — CDC management got increasingly upset and it demanded greater oversight. Cray in turn demanded (in 1962) to have his own remote lab, saying that otherwise, he would quit. Norris agreed, and Cray and his team moved to Cray's home town, Chippewa Falls, Wisconsin. Not even Norris could visit Cray's laboratory without an invitation.

== Peripherals business ==
In the early 1960s, CDC moved to the Highland Park neighborhood of St. Paul where Norris lived. Through this period, Norris became increasingly worried that CDC had to develop a "critical mass" to compete with International Business Machines (IBM). To do this, he started an aggressive program of buying up various companies to round out CDC's computer peripherals product line. The CDC strategy was to offer a peripheral product to compete with any of IBM's, but running 10% faster and costing 10% less.

=== Tape transport ===
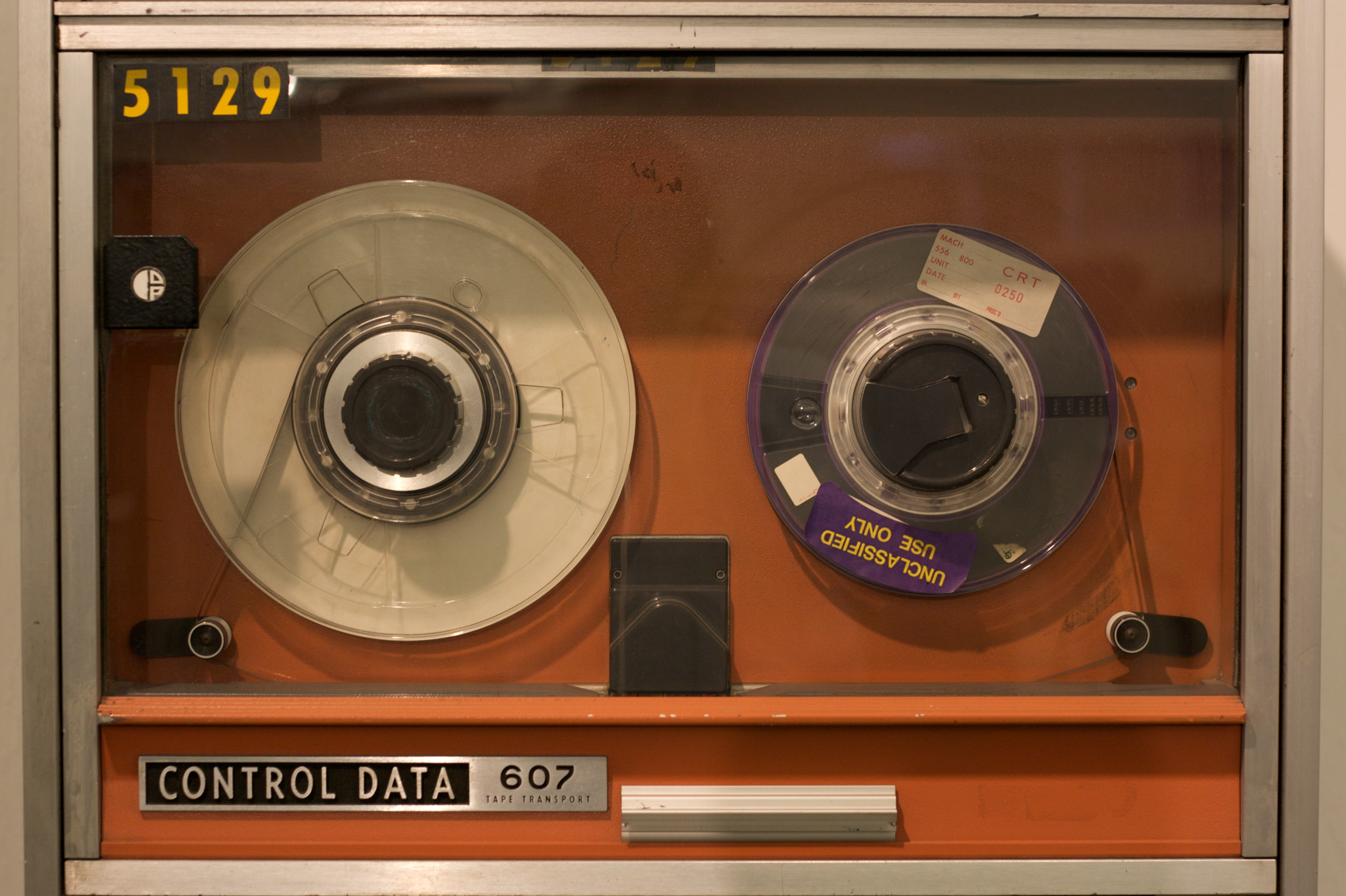
CDC 607 tape transport

One of CDC's first peripherals was the CDC 607 tape transport, an assembly that moves magnetic tape through a playback device. This product line led to some internal wrangling as the Peripherals Equipment Division attempted to find a reasonable way to charge other divisions of the company for supplying the devices. If the division simply "gave" away the tape transports at cost as part of a system purchase, they would never have a real budget of their own.

CDC finally created a plan in which the Periperals Division would share profits with the divisions selling its peripherals, a plan eventually used throughout the company.

=== Card reader and card punch ===
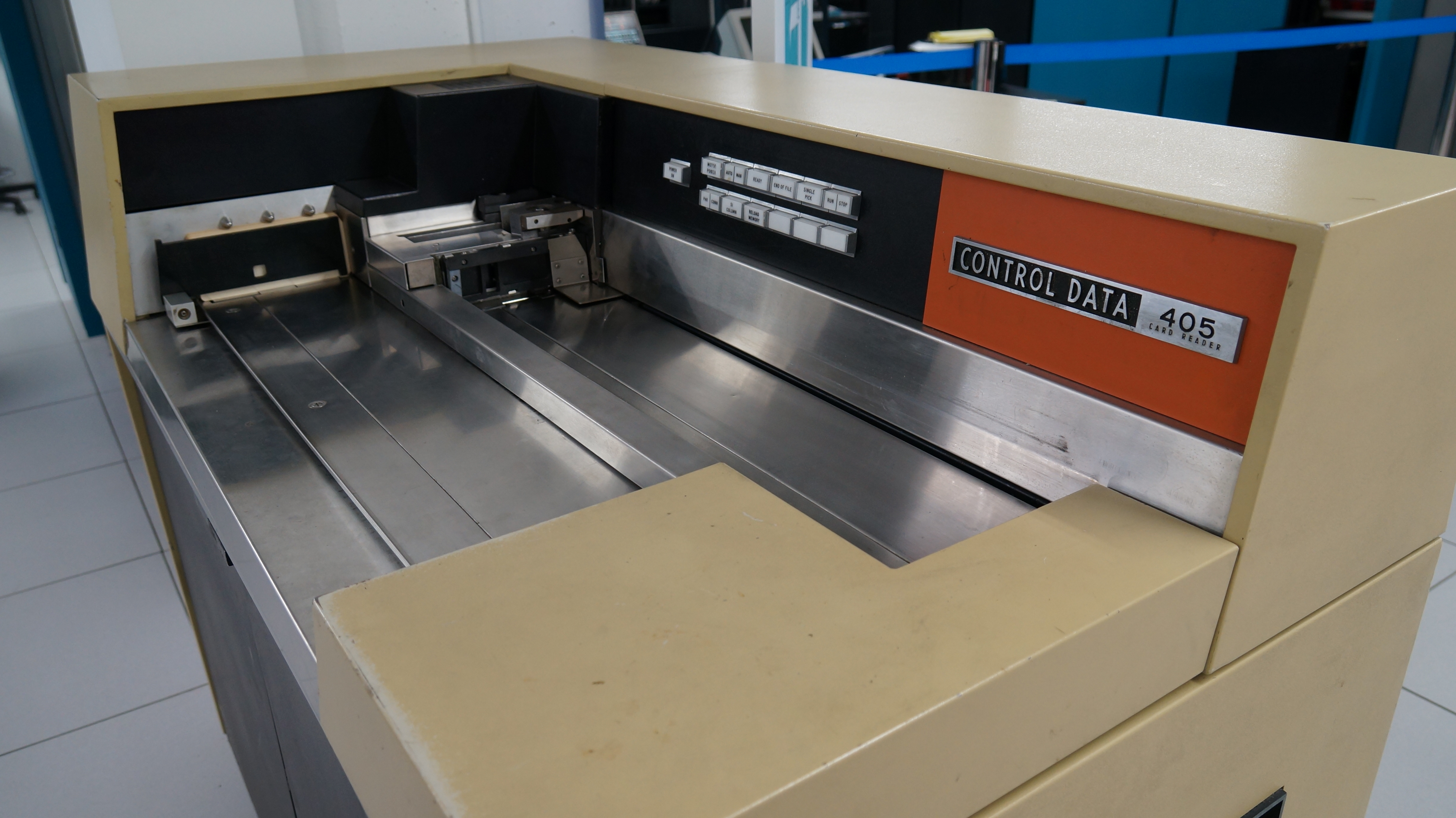
CDC 405 Card reader at Living Computer Museum (2015)

The tape transport was followed by the CDC 405 Card Reader and CDC 415 Card Punch. CDC then developed a series of tape drives and drum printers in house. With the continued delays on the OCR project, it became clear that punched cards were not going to go away any time soon, and CDC had to address this as quickly as possible. Although the 405 remained in production, its production costs were high.

CDC then purchased Bridge Engineering, which offered a line of lower-cost as well as higher-speed card punches. All card-handling products were moved to what became the Valley Forge Division after Bridge moved to a new factory, with the tape transports to follow. Later, the Valley Forge and Rochester divisions were spun off to form a new joint company with National Cash Register (later NCR Corporation), Computer Peripherals Inc (CPI), to share development and production costs across the two companies. ICL later joined the effort.

=== Printers ===
The CDC printer business was initially supported by Holley Carburetor in Rochester, Michigan. The two companies later formalized this partnership by creating a jointly held company, Holley Computer Products. Holley later sold its stake back to CDC, the remainder becoming the Rochester Division.

The Rochester Division developed train printers and band printers in a joint venture with National Cash Register (NCL) and International Computers Limited (ICL), with CDC holding a controlling interest. This company was named Computer Peripherals, Inc. (CPI). CDC in 1982 bought a controlling interest in Centronics, a manufacturer of dot matrix printers and merged CPI into it.

=== OCR systems ===
Norris was particularly interested in breaking out of the punched card–based workflow, dominated by IBM. He bought Rabinow Engineering, a pioner in the manufacture of optical character recognition (OCR) systems. The idea was to bypass the entire punched card stage by having the operators simply type content onto normal paper pages, using an OCR-friendly typewriter font. The operator could then use a reader to upload the content into the computer. Since a typed page contained much more information than a punched card (which has essentially one line of text from a page), this would offer savings all around.

This seemingly simple task turned out to be much harder than anyone expected, and while CDC became a major player in the early days of OCR systems, OCR has remained a niche product to this day. Rabinow's plant in Rockville, MD was closed in 1976, and CDC left the business.

=== Service bureaus ===
Another side effect of Norris's attempts to diversify was the creation of a number of service bureaus that ran jobs on behalf of smaller companies that could not afford to buy computers. This was never very profitable, and in 1965, several managers suggested closing the bureaus to save money. Norris chose to keep the bureaus and instead ordered an across-the-board "belt tightening".

=== Control Data Institute ===
CDC created an international technical/computer vocational school from the mid-1960s to the late 1980s. By the late 1970s there were sixty-nine learning centers worldwide, serving 18,000 students.

== CDC 6600 ==
=== 6600 design ===
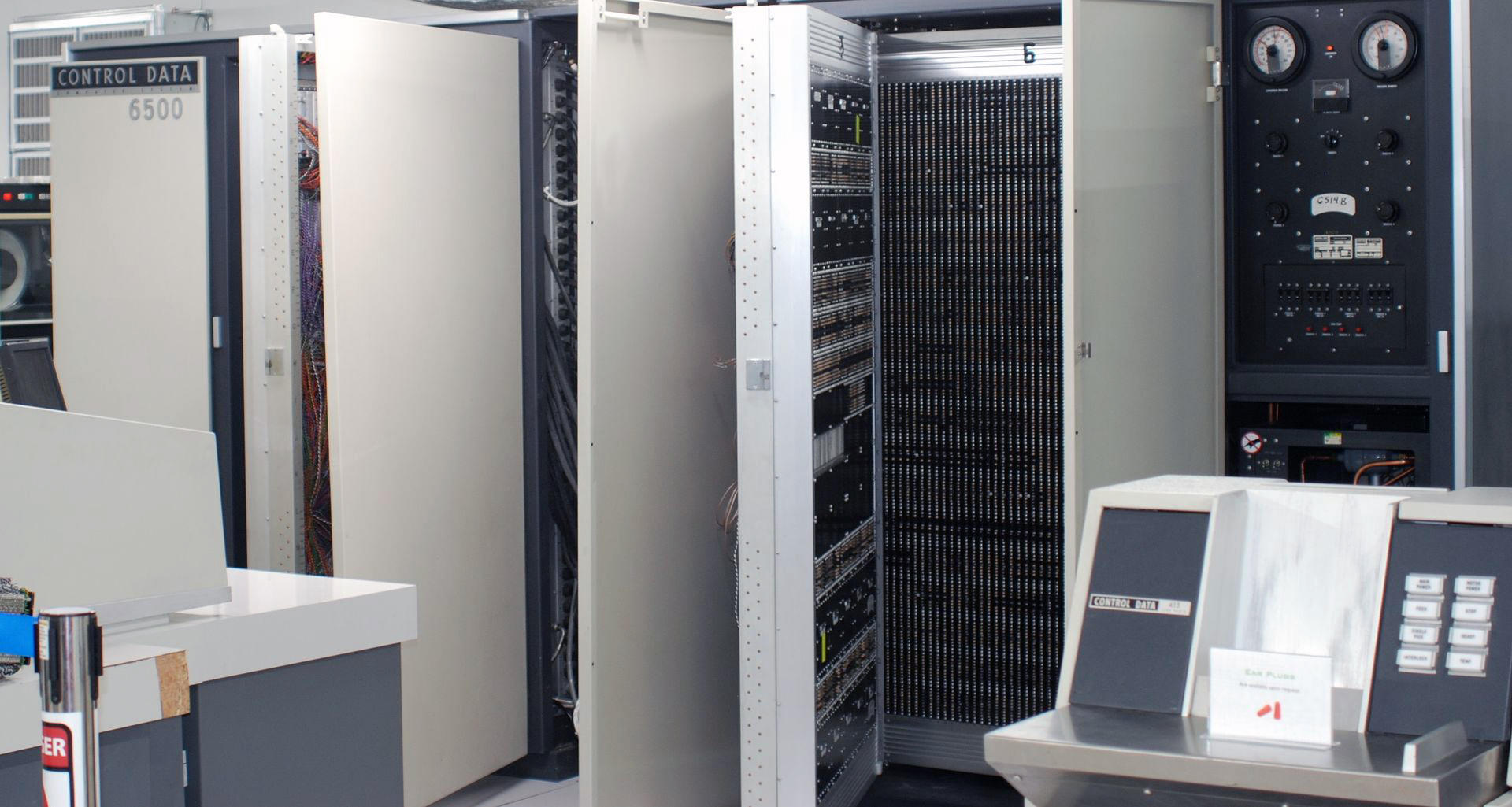
CDC 6500 Living Computer Museum, Seattle, Washington (2006)

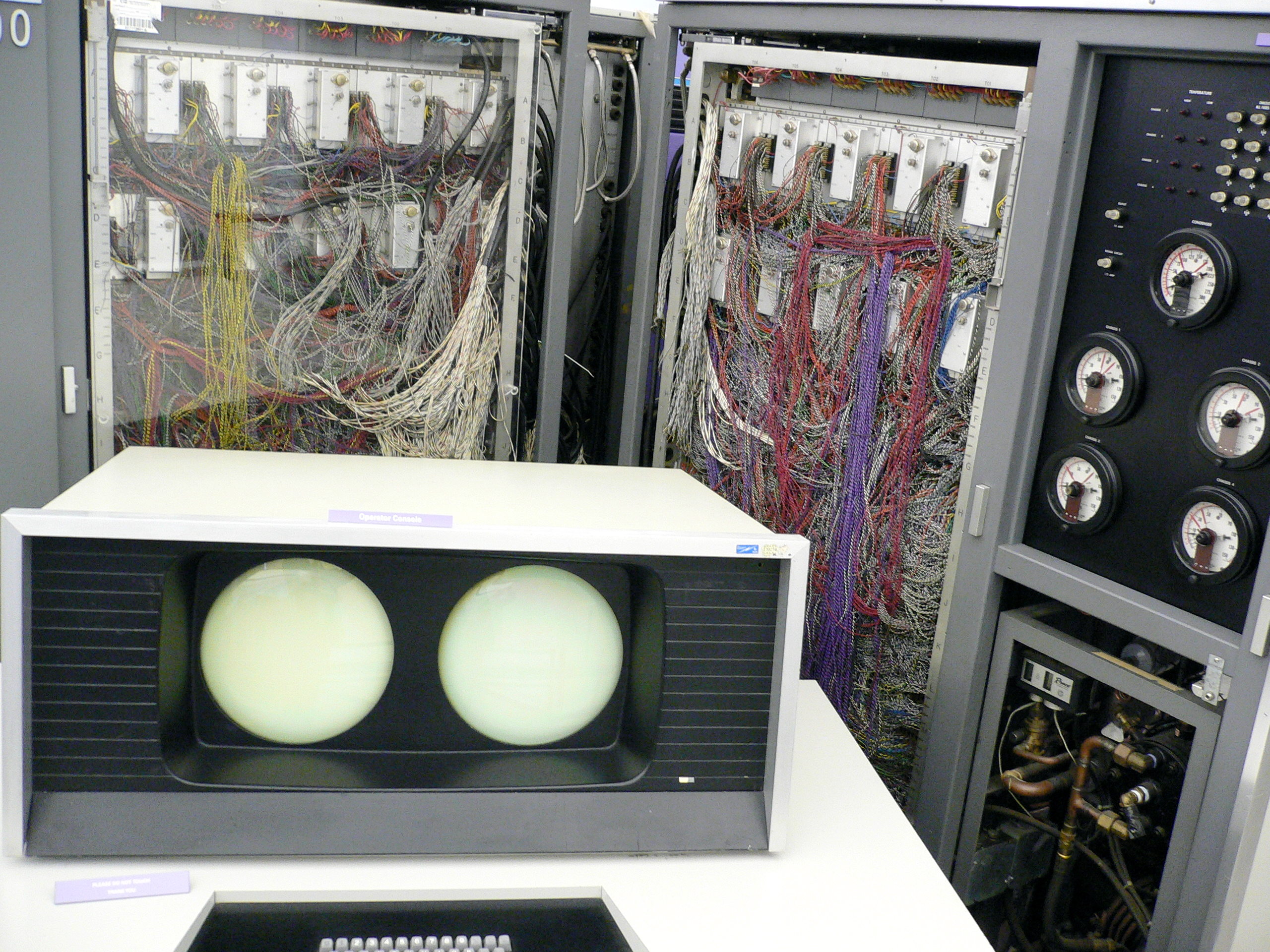
CDC 6600 (2005)

Meanwhile, at the new Chippewa Falls lab, Seymour Cray, Jim Thornton, and Dean Roush put together a team of 34 engineers, which continued work on the new computer design. One of the ways they hoped to improve the CDC 1604 was to install better transistors. Cray selected the new silicon transistors that were developmed using the planar process. Manufactured by Fairchild Semiconductor,these silicon transistors were much faster than the germanium transistors in the 1604, without the drawbacks of the older mesa silicon transistors. The speed of light restriction forced Cray to employ a more compact design, with refrigeration designed by Dean Roush.

While designing the 6600, CDC set up Project SPIN to supply the system with a high speed hard disk memory system. At the time it was unclear if disks would replace magnetic memory drums, or whether fixed or removable disks would become the more prevalent. SPIN explored all of these approaches. The team eventually delivered a 28" diameter fixed disk and a smaller multi-platter 14" removable disk-pack system. Over time, the hard disk business pioneered in SPIN became a major CDC product line.

=== 6600 release ===
In 1963, CDC introduced the CDC 6600 mainframe computer. It out-performed its competition by roughly ten times. When CDC sold over 100 6600's at $8 million ($83 million in 2025 dollars) each; it was considered a supercomputer.

The 6600 had a 100ns, transistor-based CPU (Central Processing Unit) with multiple asynchronous functional units, using 10 logical, external I/O processors to off-load many common tasks and core memory. That way, the CPU could devote all of its time and circuitry to processing actual data, while the other controllers dealt with the mundane tasks like punching cards and running disk drives. Using late-model compilers, the machine attained a standard mathematical operations rate of 500 kiloFLOPS, but handcrafted assembly managed to deliver approximately 1 megaFLOPS.

Lawrence A. Liddiard and E. James Mundstock at the University of Minnesota developed a FORTRAN compiler, known as MNF (Minnesota FORTRAN), in 1970 for the 6600.

=== CDC 6400 and 6500 ===
CDC unveiled the CDC 6400 mainframe computer in 1966. It was a simpler, slower version of the CDC 6600 that was less expensive. The 6400 used a more traditional serial processor design rather than the 6600's parallel functional units. A two-processor version of the 6400, labeled the CDC 6500, was later released.

=== IBM response to 6600 ===
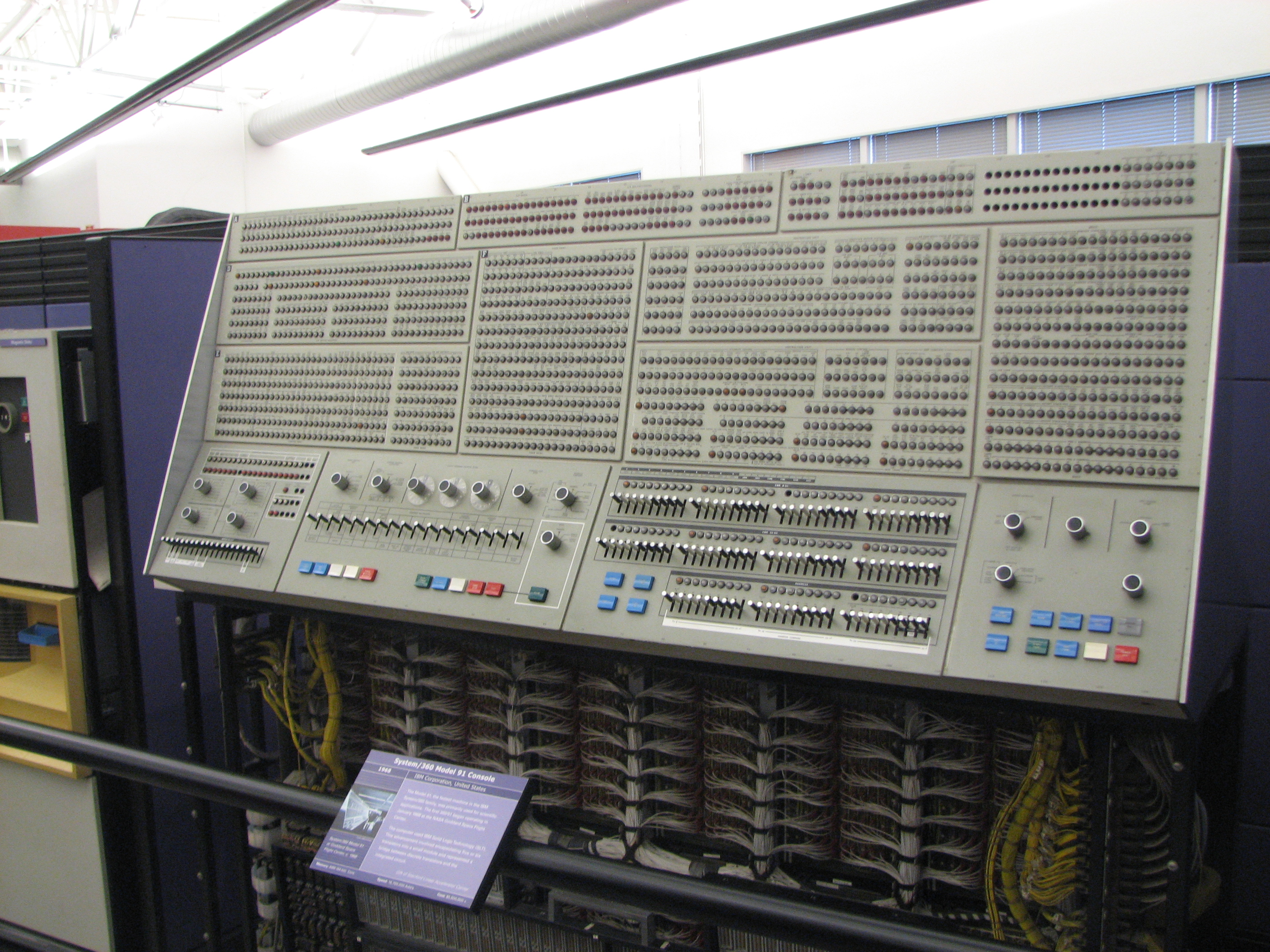
IBM System 360 mainframe

A week after the introduction of the CDC 6600 in 1963, IBM chairman Thomas J. Watson sent a memo in which he asked how a small company like CDC had managed to dethrone IBM in mainframe computers. In response, IBM in 1965 started designing the ACS-1, a mainframe meant to surpass the 6600 in speed and be compatible with the IBM System/360 line of computers. IBM created the IBM Advanced Computing Systems in Sunnyvale, California, to work on ACS-1. Despite years of development, the engineers could not make the ACS-1 compatible with the System/360 without compromising its performance. IBM canceled the ACS-1 development in 1969.

In the meantime, IBM announced a new System/360 model, the Model 92, which they claimed would be just as fast as the CDC 6600. In reality, the Model 92 did not exist. However, its announcement caused a drastic drop in 6600 sales of the 6600 as potential customers waited for the release the Model 92. Norris did not take this tactic, dubbed as fear, uncertainty and doubt (FUD), lying down, and in an extensive antitrust lawsuit launched against IBM a year later, he eventually won a settlement valued at $80 million. As part of the settlement, CDC received IBM's subsidiary, Service Bureau Corporation (SBC), which ran computer processing for other corporations on its own computers. SBC fitted nicely into CDC's existing service bureau offerings.

== CDC 7600 and 8600 ==
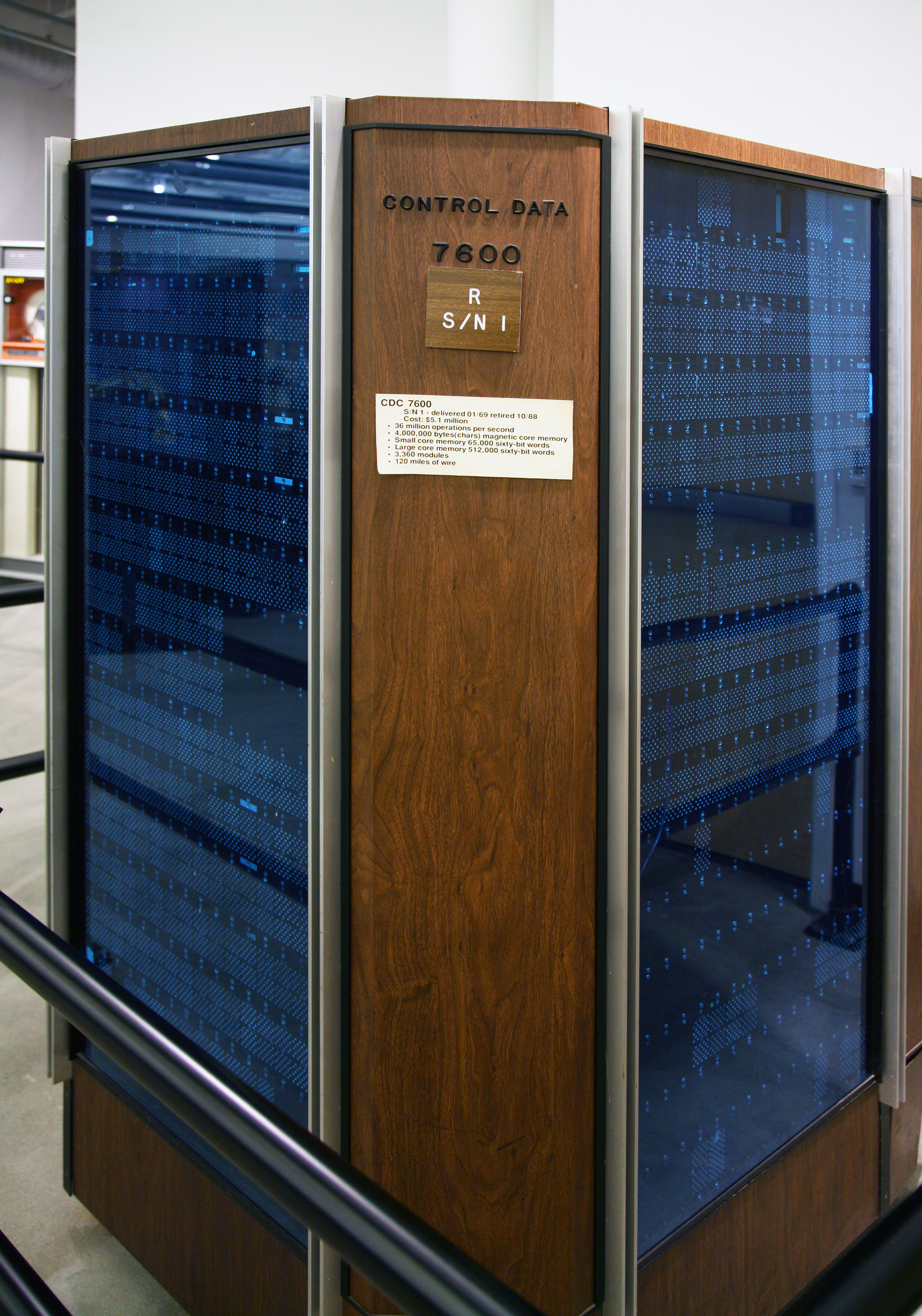
CDC 7600, serial no. 1 (2010)

=== 7600 ===
In the same month it won its lawsuit against IBM, CDC announced its new supercomputer, the CDC 7600 (previously referred to as the 6800 within CDC). This machine's hardware clock speed was almost four times that of the 6600 (36 MHz vs. 10 MHz), with a 27.5 ns clock cycle, and it offered considerably more than four times the total throughput, with much of the speed increase coming from extensive use of pipelining. The 7600 memory had a split primary- and secondary-memory which required user management but was more than fast enough to make it the fastest uniprocessor from 1969 to 1976.

The 7600 did not sell well for a number of reasons; it was introduced during a 1969 downturn in the U.S. economy, the complexity in its construction hindered its reliability and it was also not fully compatible with the 6000-series. It also required a completely different operating system from the 6000-series; which like most new OSs, was primitive. The 7600 project paid for itself, but damaged CDC's reputation. A few dozen 7600s were the computers of choice at supercomputer centers around the world.

=== 8600 ===
In 1968, Cray began designing the CDC 8600 supercomputer. This design included four processors similar to those in the CDC 7600, packaged in a single, smaller case. The smaller size and shorter signal paths allowed the 8600 to run at much higher clock speeds. Combined with its faster memory, the 8600 had good performance gains.

However, the 8600 had significant problems. In manufacturing its circuit boards, Cray chose to solder individual components to the board. The design of the 8600 made it impossbile to cool effectively. As a result, the hot-running solder joints degraded the computer's reliability. The compact design also complicated maintenance of the 8600.

Cray soon recognized that the 8600 needed a redesign. However, Norris believed that CDC did not have enough research and development funding for an 8600 redesign along with the development of the new STAR-100. In 1972, Cray left CDC to form Cray Research to build supercomputers. Norris remained a staunch supporter of Cray and even invested in Cray Research.

== STAR-100 ==
=== STAR-100 design ===
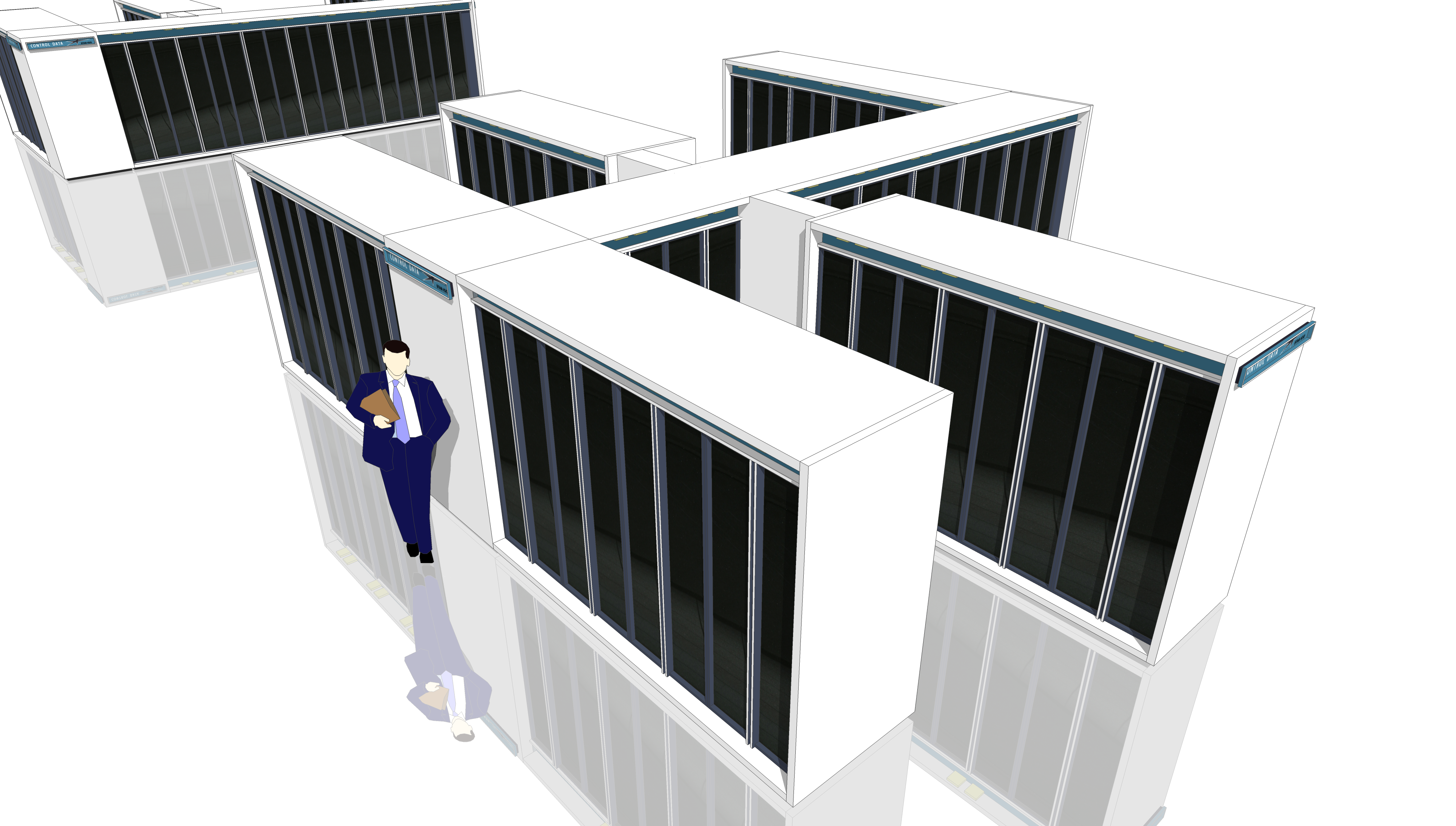
CDC STAR-100 - 8MB and 4MB versions

The CDC STAR-100 project was led by Jim Thornton, Cray's former collaborator on the CDC 6600/760 series. Unlike the 8600's "four computers in one box" solution to the speed problem, the STAR-100 had a new design using a vector processor. By highly pipelining mathematical instructions with purpose-built instructions and hardware, mathematical processing is dramatically improved in a machine that was otherwise slower than a 7600.

The STAR-100 was not a general purpose mainframe like the CDC 7600. It was designed for customers who only wanted it to solve certain limited problems.

=== STAR-100 introduction ===
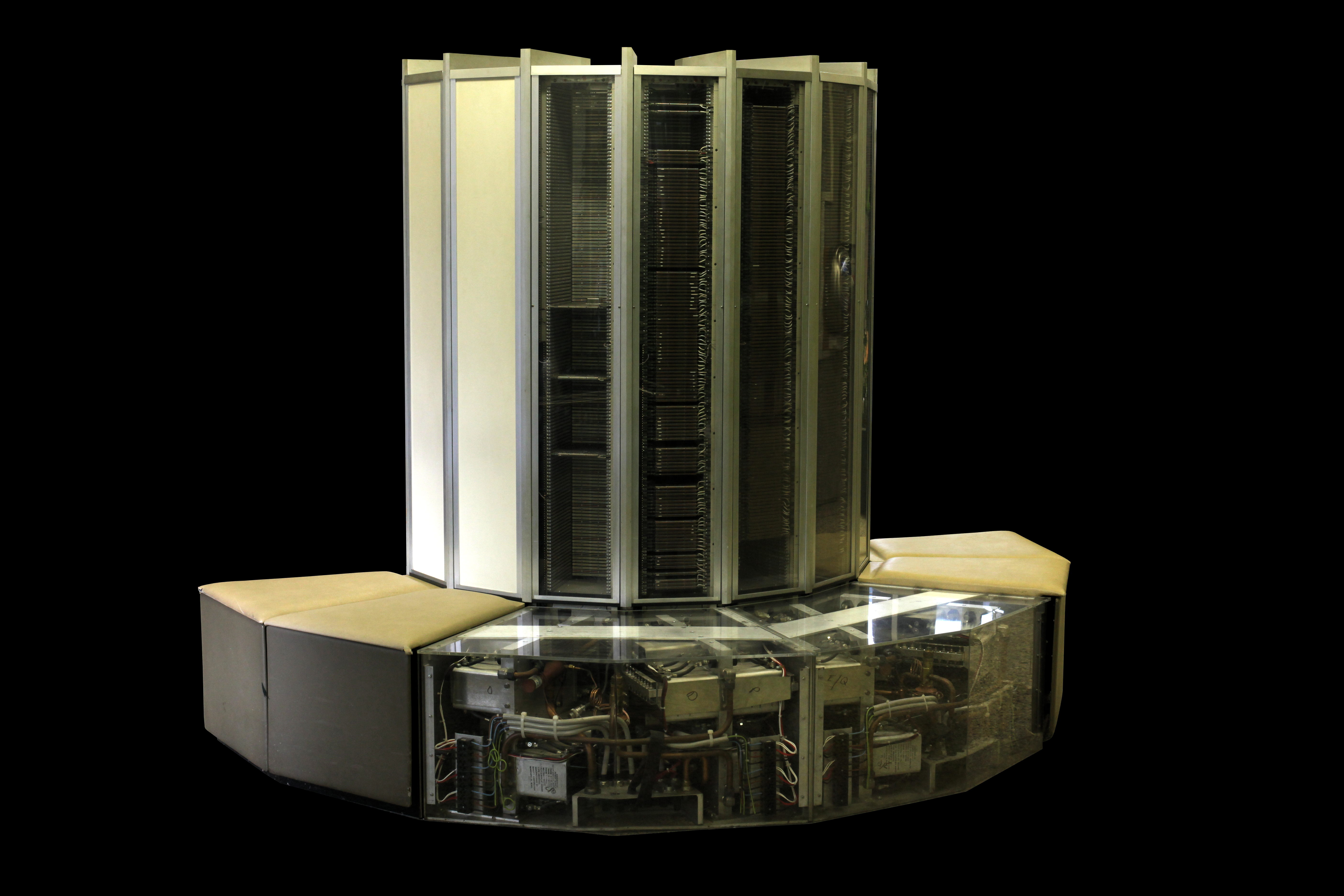
Cray 1 supercomputer

In 1974, CDC released the STAR-100 (designated as the Cyber 203),It turned out to have "real world" performance that was considerably worse than expected. That same year, Thornton left CDC to form the Network Systems Corporation.

In 1975, CDC installed a STAR-100 at one of its service centers; it was considered the first supercomputers used in a data center. Norris presided at the press conference announcing the new event. CDC publicists coordinated the event Guinness, which declared the Star-100 as "The most powerful and fastest computer" in the Guinness Book of World Records.

The STAR-100 customers were mainly oil companies who needed powerful computers to run simulations of oil reservoirs. In one instance, a customer running a simulation on a STAR-100 in Texas was able to solve oil extraction problems for oil fields in Kuwait. A front page Wall Street Journal news article on the STAR-100 resulted in CDC acquiring one new customer, Allis-Chalmers. They used the STAR-100 to simulate a damaged hydroelectric turbine in a power plant in Norway.

In 1975, Cray Research introduced the Cray-1. It used the same basic design techniques as the STAR-100, but was much faster. The Star-100 could process vectors up to 64K (65536) elements, versus 64 elements for the Cray-1. However, the Star-100 took much longer to initiate the operation, so the Cray-1 outperformed it with short vectors.

== Government and military applications ==
=== CDC 5400B ===
In 1964, CDC, a subcontractor to Hughes Aircraft Company's Radar Systems Group, built this computer for the AN/AWG-9 radar system aboard the Grumman F-14 Tomcat.The 5400B had a Central processing unit, executing programs with 24-bit instructions, four index registers plus two types of Random-Access Memory. There were 3,072 96-bit words of thin-film Non-destructive Readout Memory and 4,096 24-bit words of Destructive Readout Memory. The computer was 1.1 cubic feet in size and weighed less than 40 lb.

=== AN/AYK-14B ===
CDC's Aerospace Division in Bloomington MN (later, acquired by General Dynamics) built this 16-bit computer based on Advanced Micro Devices' 2900 series starting in 1976. The AN/AYK-14B is designed for airborne use and can tolerate temperatures from -54C to 71C. The AN/AYK14(V) computer was used in the McDonnell Douglas F/A-18 Hornet, Grumman E-2 Hawkeye (C model), McDonnell Douglas AV-8B Harrier II, Grumman A-6 Intruder(F model), Grumman EA-6B Prowler, F-14D Super Tomcat, Lockheed S-3 Viking, Bell–Boeing V-22 Osprey, EP-3, and others.

== Cyber product lines ==
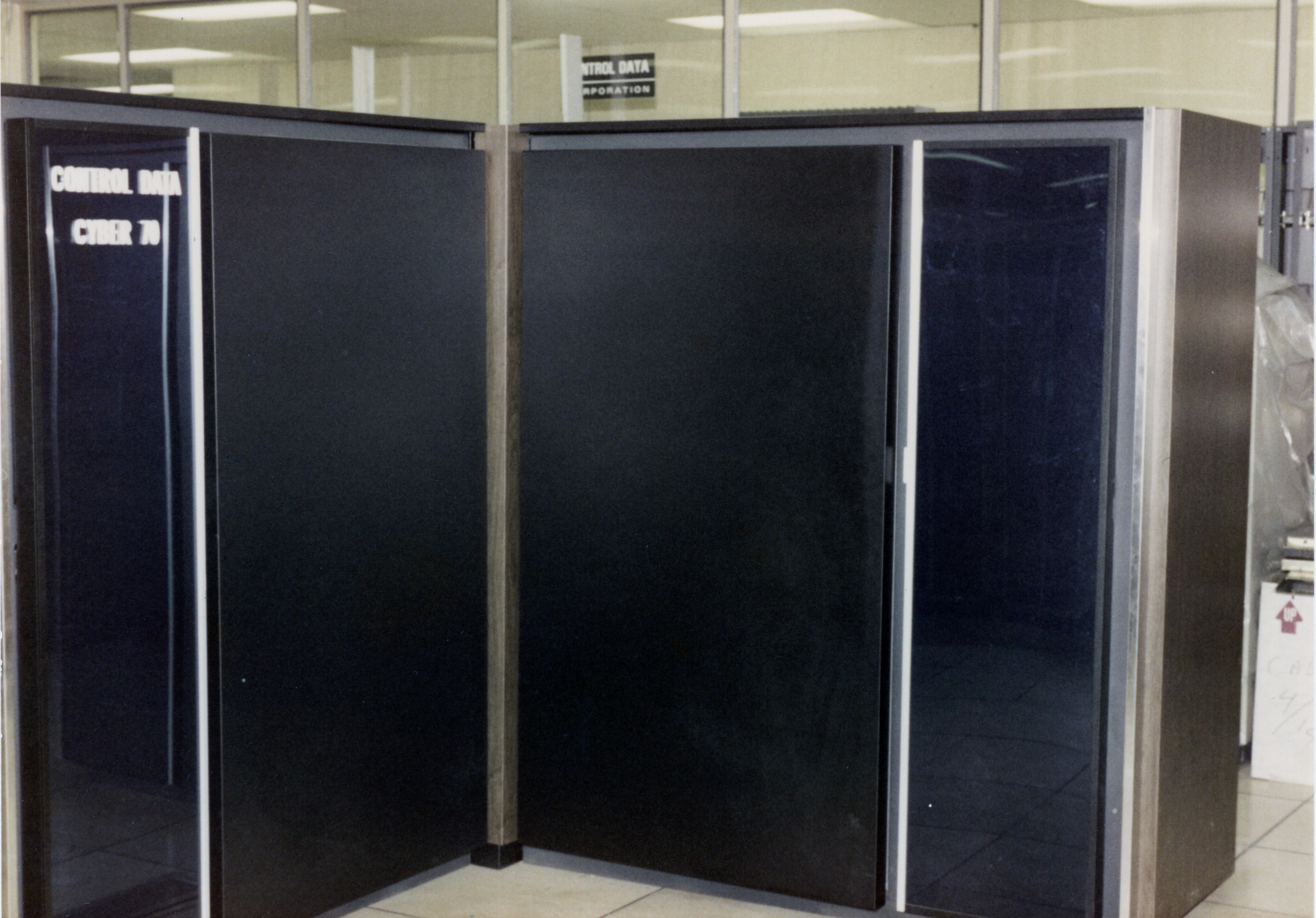
CDC Cyber 70

A variety of systems based on the basic 6600/7600 architecture were repackaged in different price/performance categories of the CDC Cyber, which became CDC's main product line in the 1970s. An updated version of the STAR architecture, the Cyber 205, had considerably better performance than the original.

Sales of the STAR were weak, but CDC produced a successor system, the Cyber 200/205, that gave Cray Research some competition. CDC also embarked on a number of special projects for its clients, who produced an even smaller number of black project computers. The CDC Advanced Flexible Processor (AFP), also known as CYBER PLUS, was one such machine.

Another design direction was the "Cyber 80" project, which was aimed at release in 1980. This machine could run old 6600-style programs, and also had a completely new 64-bit architecture. The concept behind Cyber 80 was that current 6000-series users would migrate to these machines with relative ease. The design and debugging of these machines went on past 1980, and the machines were eventually released under other names.

In 1986, CDC introduced the Cyber 910 family. These were rebadged Silicon Graphics International (SGI) workstations; CDC had taken a 20% stake in SGI. The first Cyber 910 workstation, the 910-300, was based on SGI's Iris 3100 workstation, employing the Motorola 68020 processor. Later Cyber workstations would reflect SGI's migration to the MIPS processor architecture. CDC introduced workstation and server models employing the R2000 and R3000 RISC microprocessors and running SGI's IRIX operating system.

CDC was also attempting to diversify its revenue from hardware into services and this included its promotion of the PLATO computer-aided learning system, which ran on Cyber hardware and incorporated many early computer interface innovations including bit-mapped touchscreen terminals.

== Magnetic Peripherals Inc. ==
Meanwhile, several very large Japanese manufacturing firms were entering the market. The supercomputer market was too small to support more than a handful of companies, so CDC started looking for other markets. One of these was the hard disk drive (HDD) market.

Magnetic Peripherals Inc. (MPI) started as in 1975 as a joint venture with Honeywell Corporation to manufacture HDDs for both companies. CII-Honeywell Bull later purchased a 3% interest in MPI from Honeywell. Sperry became a partner in MPI in 1983 with 17%, making the ownership split CDC (67%) and Honeywell (17%). MPI was a captive supplier to its parent companies, selling drives only on an OEM basis to them CDC sold MPI product to third parties under the CDC brand name.

MPI soon became a major player in the HDD market. It was the worldwide leader in 14-inch disk drive technology in the OEM marketplace in the late 1970s and early 1980s especially with its SMD (Storage Module Device) and CMD (Cartridge Module Drive). The MPI plant at Brynmawr in Wales was running continuous shifts to meet the demand. The MPI division in Brynmawr had produced one million disks and three million magnetic tapes by October 1979.

CDC was an early developer of the eight-inch drive technology with products from its MPI Operation in Oklahoma City. Its CDC Wren series drives were particularly popular with high end users. However, the Wren was behind the capacity growth and performance curves of numerous startups such as Micropolis, Atasi, Maxtor, and Quantum. CDC also co-developed the now-universal Advanced Technology Attachment (ATA) interface with Compaq and Western Digital, which was aimed at lowering the cost of adding low-performance drives.

CDC founded a separate division called Rigidyne in Simi Valley, California, to develop 3.5-inch drives using technology from the Wren series. These drives were marketed by CDC as the Swift series. When introduced in 1987, the Swift drives were among the first high-performance 3.5-inch drives on the market..

== Investments ==
CDC held interests in other companies including computer research company Arbitron, Commercial Credit Corporation and Ticketron.

=== Commercial Credit Corporation ===
In 1968, Commercial Credit Corporation (CCC) became the target of a hostile takeover by Loews Inc. Loews had acquired nearly 10% of CCC stock, which it intended to break up on acquisition. To avoid the takeover, CCC forged a deal with CDC lending them the money to purchase control in CCC instead, and "That is how a computer company came to own a fleet of fishing boats in the Chesapeake Bay." By the 1980s, CDC need to sell many of their assets. In 1986 the banker, Sandy Weill convinced the CDC management to spin off their Commercial Credit subsidiary to prevent CDC's potential liquidation. Over a period of years, Weill used Commercial Credit to build an empire that became Citigroup. In 1999, Commercial Credit was renamed CitiFinancial, and in 2011, the full-service network of US CitiFinancial branches were renamed OneMain Financial.

=== Ticketron ===
In 1969, CDC acquired a 51% interest in Ticketron for $3.9 million from Cemp Investments. In 1970, Ticketron became the sole computerized ticketing provider in the United States. Ticketron also provided ticketing terminals and back-end infrastructure for parimutuel betting. The division provided similar services for a number of US lotteries, including those in New York, Illinois, Pennsylvania, Delaware, Washington and Maryland.In 1973, CDC increased its investment in Ticketron. By the mid 1980s, Ticketron was CDC's most profitable business, with revenue of $120 million.

=== ETA Systems ===
CDC decided to fight for the high-performance niche, but Norris considered that the company had become moribund and unable to quickly design competitive machines. In 1983 he set up a spinoff company, ETA Systems, whose design goal was a machine processing data at 10 GFLOPs, about 40 times the speed of the Cray-1. The ETA mainframe was one of the fastest computers on the market. The ETAs used the new CMOS chips, which produced much less heat than comparable chips.

The company sold seven liquid nitrogen-cooled ETAs and 27 smaller air cooled versions during the next few years. However, the design never fully matured, and ETA was unable to reach its goals. CDC tried unsuccessfully to sell ETA Systems. In 1989, ETA laid off most of its employees; a few were folded into CDC.

== End of CDC ==
=== Final years ===
By the late 1980s, the personal computer was making large inroads into the mainframe business. Despite having valuable technology, CDC suffered huge losses in 1985 ($567 million) and in 1986 while attempting to reorganize. While CDC was still making computers, hardware manufacturing was no longer sufficiently profitable for them.

CDC began selling off some of their affiliated businesses to raise cash. In 1987, CDC sold its PathLab Laboratory Information System to 3M Corporation. In 1988, management decided to exit the computer hardware business entirely. That same year, CDC merged Rigidyne and MPI into the umbrella subsidiary of Imprimis Technology. CDC spun off VTC, a chip maker.

Also in 1988, CDC announced its Transparent Computing Environment strategy. This involved integrating its existing Cyber products with personal computers and workstation products. CDC was aiming to support standards-based networking and programming languages, and implementing the Unix operating system on its workstation, mainframe and ETA supercomputer product lines.

In 1989, Seagate Technology purchased Imprimis from CDC for $250 million in cash, 10.7 million in Seagate stock and a $50 million promissory note. Needing cash, CDC started looking for someone to buy Ticketron. In 1990, The Carlyle Group bought the majority of Ticketron's assets and business. To avoid anti-trust issues with the federal government, Carlyle did not purchase the Telecharge business unit, which handled ticket sales for Broadway theaters. In 1991, Carlyle sold Ticketron to its rival, Ticketmaster.

By 1992, despite selling many of its businesses, CDC was experiencing a severe liquidity crisis. It could not find investors who would fund a corporation "...with interests as diverse as proprietary mainframes, Unix, military and government software and services and a lottery business". To avoid bankruptcy, CDC was forced to separate into two independent companies:

- Control Data Systems, Inc. (CDS), with the computer-related businesses
- Ceridian Corporation with the information service businesses.

This was the end of Control Data Corporation

=== CDS ===
Control Data Systems logo

During the mid-1990s, CDS bought ICEM Technologies, the makers of ICEM DDN and ICEM Surf software. CDS sold ICEM to the software company PTC Inc. for $40.6 million in 1998. In 2000, CDS was bought out by Syntegra, a subsidiary of British Telecommunications PLC, for $340 million. CDS was merged into BT's Global Services organization.

=== Ceredian ===
Ceridian continued for several years as a successful outsourced IT company primarily focused on human resources. Its Empros Division provided control systems solutions that managed as much as 25% of all generated electricity worldwide. Ceredian sold Empros to Siemens in 1993. In 1997, General Dynamics acquired the Computing Devices International Division of Ceridian. This division was a defense electronics and systems integration business headquartered in Bloomington, Minnesota – originally CDC's Government Systems Division.

In March 2001, Ceridian separated into two independent companies. The old Ceridian Corporation renamed itself as Arbitron Inc. The human resources services and the Comdata business kept the Ceridian name. The new Ceridian split again in 2013, with formation of Ceridian HCM Holding Inc. (human resources services) and Comdata Inc. (payments business), marking the end of CDC assets split for good.

== Timeline of systems releases ==
- CDC 1604 et al. – 1604, 1604-A, 1604-B, 1604-C, 924 (a "cut down" 1604 sibling)
  * CDC 160 series – 160, 160A (160-A), 160G (160-G)
  * CDC 3000 series – 3100, 3200, 3300, 3400, 3500, 3600, 3800
  * CDC 6000 series – 6200, 6400, 6500, 6700
  * CDC 6600
  * CDC 7600
  * CDC CYBER – 17, 18, 71, 72, 73, 74, 76, 170, 171, 172, 173, 174, 175, 176, 203, 205, Omega/480, 700
  * CDC STAR-100
- 1957 – Founding
- 1959 – 1604
- 1960 – 1604-B
- 1961 – 160
- 1962 – 924 (a 24-bit 1604)
- 1963 – 160A (160-A), 1604-A, 3400, 6600
- 1964 – 160G (160-G), 3100, 3200, 3600, 6400
- 1965 – 1604-C, 1700, 3300, 3500, 8050, 8090
- 1966 – 3800, 6200, 6500, Station 6000
- 1968 – 7600
- 1969 – 6700
- 1970 – STAR-100
- 1971 – Cyber 71, Cyber 72, Cyber 73, Cyber 74, Cyber 76
- 1972 – 5600, 8600
- 1973 – Cyber 170, Cyber 172, Cyber 173, Cyber 174, Cyber 175, Cyber 17
- 1976 – Cyber 18
- 1977 – Cyber 171, Cyber 176, Omega/480
- 1979 – Cyber 203, Cyber 720, Cyber 730, Cyber 740, Cyber 750, Cyber 760
- 1980 – Cyber 205
- 1982 – Cyber 815, Cyber 825, Cyber 835, Cyber 845, Cyber 855, Cyber 865, Cyber 875
- 1983 – ETA10
- 1984 – Cyber 810, Cyber 830, Cyber 840, Cyber 850, Cyber 860, Cyber 990, CyberPlus
- 1987 – Cyber 910, Cyber 930, Cyber 995
- 1988 – Cyber 960
- 1989 – Cyber 920, Cyber 2000

Note: The 8xx & 9xx Cyber models, introduced beginning in 1982, formed the 64-bit Cyber 180 series, and their Peripheral Processors (PPs) were 16-bit. The 180 series had virtual memory capability, using CDC's NOS/VE operating system.
The more complete nomenclature for these was 180/xxx, although at times the shorter form (e.g. Cyber 990) was used.

== Peripheral Systems Group ==
CDC Corporation's Peripheral Systems Group was both a hardware and a software development unit that functioned in the 1970s and 1980s.

Their services including development and marketing of IBM-oriented (operating) systems software. One of the Peripheral Systems Group's software products was named CUPID, "Control Data's Program for Unlike Data Set Concatenation." Its focus was for customers of IBM's MVS operating system, and the intended audience was systems programmers. The product's General Information and Reference Manual included SysGen-like options and information about internal user-accessible control blocks.

== Film and science fiction references ==
- Mars Needs Women (1967) – a CDC 3400 is used for radio communication and to direct the actions of the military as they intercept the Martian spaceships.
- Colossus: The Forbin Project (1970) – The title sequences to this film include tape drives and other early CDC equipment.
- The Mad Bomber (1973) – The police department has a CDC 3100 that they use to profile the bomber.
- The Adolescence of P-1 (1977), by Thomas Ryan – CDC computers were very enticing to young P-1.
- The New Avengers – In episode 2-10 (#23) ("Complex", 1977) Purdey uses a CDC card reader.
- Mi-Sex – Computer Games: 1979 pop music video. The band enters the computer room in the CDC North Sydney building and proceeds to play with CDC equipment.
- Tron (1982) – In the wide screen version of the film, when Flynn and Lora sneak into Encom, a CDC 7600 is visible in the background, alongside a Cray-1. This scene was shot at the Lawrence Livermore National Laboratory.
- Die Hard (1988) – The computer room shot up by one of the terrorists contained a number of working Cyber 180 computers and a mock-up of an ETA-10 supercomputer, along with a number of other peripheral devices, all provided by CDC Demonstration Services/Benchmark Lab. This equipment was requested on short notice after another computer manufacturer backed out at the last minute. Paul Derby, manager of the Benchmark Lab, arranged to send two van-loads of equipment to Hollywood for the shoot, accompanied by Jerry Sterns of the Benchmark Lab who supervised the equipment while it was on the set. After the machines were returned to Minnesota, they were inspected and tested, and as each machine was sold, a notation was made in the corporate records that the machine had appeared in the film.
- They Live (1988), by John Carpenter – As Roddy Piper's character is trying on his new "sunglasses" that allow him to see the world as it is, he looks at an advertisement for CDC and sees the word OBEY. The film's credits include "special thanks" to CDC.
