= Aiken code =

Complementary binary-coded decimal code

- Digits: 4
- Tracks: 4
- Digit values: 2 4 2 1
- Weight(s): 0..4
- Continuity: no
- Cyclic: no
- Minimum distance: 1
- Maximum distance: 4
- Redundancy: 0.7
- Lexicography: yes
- Complement: 9

The Aiken code (also known as 2421 code) is a complementary binary-coded decimal (BCD) code. A group of four bits is assigned to the decimal digits from 0 to 9 according to the following table. The code was developed by Howard Hathaway Aiken and is still used today in digital clocks, pocket calculators and similar devices.

The Aiken code differs from the standard 8421 BCD code in that the Aiken code does not weight the fourth digit as 8 as with the standard BCD code but with 2.

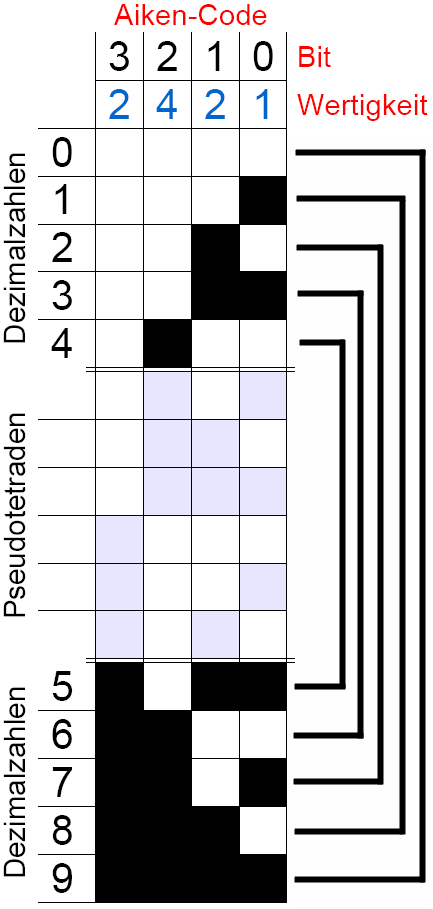
Aiken code (symmetry property)

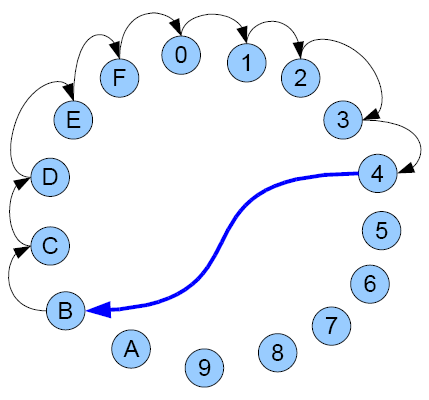
Aiken code in hexadecimal coding

The following weighting is obtained for the Aiken code: 2-4-2-1.

One might think that double codes are possible for a number, for example 1011 and 0101 could represent 5. However, here one makes sure that the digits 0 to 4 are mirror image complementary to the numbers 5 to 9.

Aiken code
Decimal digit	Aiken 2 4 2 1 code
0	0 0 0 0
1	0 0 0 1
2	0 0 1 0
3	0 0 1 1
4	0 1 0 0
5	1 0 1 1
6	1 1 0 0
7	1 1 0 1
8	1 1 1 0
9	1 1 1 1

== See also ==
- Excess-3 code
- Gray code
- O'Brien code type I
