= Gray code =

Ordering of binary values, used for positioning and error correction

	Gray code			
	4	3	2	1
0	0	0	0	0
1	0	0	0	1
2	0	0	1	1
3	0	0	1	0
4	0	1	1	0
5	0	1	1	1
6	0	1	0	1
7	0	1	0	0
8	1	1	0	0
9	1	1	0	1
10	1	1	1	1
11	1	1	1	0
12	1	0	1	0
13	1	0	1	1
14	1	0	0	1
15	1	0	0	0

The reflected binary code (RBC), also known as reflected binary (RB) or Gray code after Frank Gray, is an ordering of the binary numeral system such that two successive values differ in only one bit (binary digit).

For example, the representation of the decimal value "1" in binary would normally be "001", and "2" would be "010". In Gray code, these values are represented as "001" and "011". That way, incrementing a value from 1 to 2 requires only one bit to change, instead of two.

Gray codes are widely used to prevent spurious output from electromechanical switches and to facilitate error correction in digital communications such as digital terrestrial television and some cable TV systems. The use of Gray code in these devices helps simplify logic operations and reduce errors in practice.

== Function ==
Many devices indicate position by closing and opening switches. If that device uses natural binary codes, positions 3 and 4 are next to each other but all three bits of the binary representation differ:

Decimal	Binary
3	011
4	100

The problem with natural binary codes is that physical switches are not ideal: it is very unlikely that physical switches will change states exactly in synchrony. In the transition between the two states shown above, all three switches change state. In the brief period while all are changing, the switches will read some spurious position. Even without keybounce, the transition might look like 011 — 001 — 101 — 100. When the switches appear to be in position 001, the observer cannot tell if that is the "real" position 1, or a transitional state between two other positions. If the output feeds into a sequential system, possibly via combinational logic, then the sequential system may store a false value.

This problem can be solved by changing only one switch at a time, so there is never any ambiguity of position, resulting in codes assigning to each of a contiguous set of integers, or to each member of a circular list, a word of symbols such that no two code words are identical and each two adjacent code words differ by exactly one symbol. These codes are also known as unit-distance, single-distance, single-step, monostrophic or syncopic codes, in reference to the Hamming distance of 1 between adjacent codes.

== Invention ==
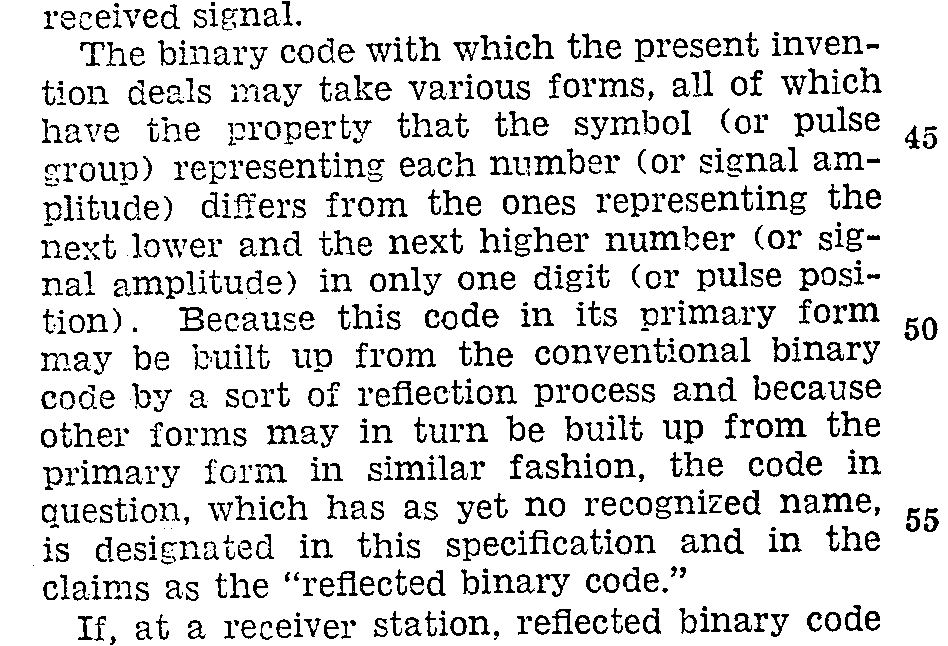
Gray's patent introduces the term "reflected binary code"

In principle, there can be more than one such code for a given word length, but the term Gray code was first applied to a particular binary code for non-negative integers, the binary-reflected Gray code, or BRGC. The Bell Labs researcher George R. Stibitz described such a code in a 1941 patent application, granted in 1943. Frank Gray introduced the term reflected binary code in his 1947 patent application, remarking that the code had "as yet no recognized name". He derived the name from the fact that it "may be built up from the conventional binary code by a sort of reflection process".

Visualized as a traversal of vertices of a tesseract

Gray code along the number line

In the standard encoding of the Gray code the least significant bit follows a repetitive pattern of 2 on, 2 off (… 11001100 …); the next digit a pattern of 4 on, 4 off; the i-th least significant bit a pattern of 2^{i} on 2^{i} off. The most significant digit is an exception to this: for an n-bit Gray code, the most significant digit follows the pattern 2^{n − 1} on, 2^{n − 1} off, which is the same (cyclic) sequence of values as for the second-most significant digit, but shifted forwards 2^{n − 2} places. The four-bit version of this is shown below:

Decimal	Binary	Gray
0	0000	0000
1	0001	0001
2	0010	0011
3	0011	0010
4	0100	0110
5	0101	0111
6	0110	0101
7	0111	0100
8	1000	1100
9	1001	1101
10	1010	1111
11	1011	1110
12	1100	1010
13	1101	1011
14	1110	1001
15	1111	1000

For decimal 15 the code rolls over to decimal 0 with only one switch change. This is called the cyclic or adjacency property of the code.

In modern digital communications, Gray codes play an important role in error correction. For example, in a digital modulation scheme such as QAM where data are typically transmitted in symbols of four bits, or more, the signal's constellation diagram is arranged so that the bit patterns conveyed by adjacent constellation points differ by only one bit. By combining this with forward error correction capable of correcting single-bit errors, it is possible for a receiver to correct any transmission errors that cause a constellation point to deviate into the area of an adjacent point. This makes the transmission system less susceptible to noise.

Despite the fact that Stibitz described this code before Gray, the reflected binary code was later named after Gray by others who used it. Two different 1953 patent applications use "Gray code" as an alternative name for the "reflected binary code"; one of those also lists "minimum error code" and "cyclic permutation code" among the names. A 1954 patent application refers to "the Bell Telephone Gray code". Other names include "cyclic binary code", "cyclic progression code", "cyclic permuting binary" or "cyclic permuted binary" (CPB).

The Gray code is sometimes misattributed to 19th century electrical device inventor Elisha Gray.

== History and practical application ==
=== Mathematical puzzles ===
Reflected binary codes were applied to mathematical puzzles before they became known to engineers.

The binary-reflected Gray code represents the underlying scheme of the classical Chinese rings puzzle, a sequential mechanical puzzle mechanism described by the French Louis Gros in 1872.

It can serve as a solution guide for the Towers of Hanoi problem, based on a game by the French Édouard Lucas in 1883. Similarly, the so-called Towers of Bucharest and Towers of Klagenfurt game configurations yield ternary and pentary Gray codes.

Martin Gardner wrote a popular account of the Gray code in his August 1972 "Mathematical Games" column in Scientific American.

The code also forms a Hamiltonian cycle in a hypercube graph, of length $2^d.$

=== Telegraphy codes ===
When the French engineer Émile Baudot changed from using a 6-unit (6-bit) code to 5-unit code for his printing telegraph system, in 1875 or 1876, he ordered the alphabetic characters on his print wheel using a reflected binary code, and assigned the codes using only three of the bits to vowels. With vowels and consonants sorted in their alphabetical order, and other symbols appropriately placed, the 5-bit character code has been recognized as a reflected binary code. This code became known as Baudot code and, with minor changes, was eventually adopted as International Telegraph Alphabet No. 1 (ITA1, CCITT-1) in 1932.

About the same time, the German-Austrian Otto Schäffler demonstrated another printing telegraph in Vienna using a 5-bit reflected binary code for the same purpose, in 1874.

=== Analog-to-digital signal conversion ===
Frank Gray, who became famous for inventing the signaling method that came to be used for compatible color television, invented a method to convert analog signals to reflected binary code groups using vacuum tube-based apparatus. Filed in 1947, the method and apparatus were granted a patent in 1953, and the name of Gray stuck to the codes. The "PCM tube" apparatus that Gray patented was made by Raymond W. Sears of Bell Labs, working with Gray and William M. Goodall, who credited Gray for the idea of the reflected binary code.

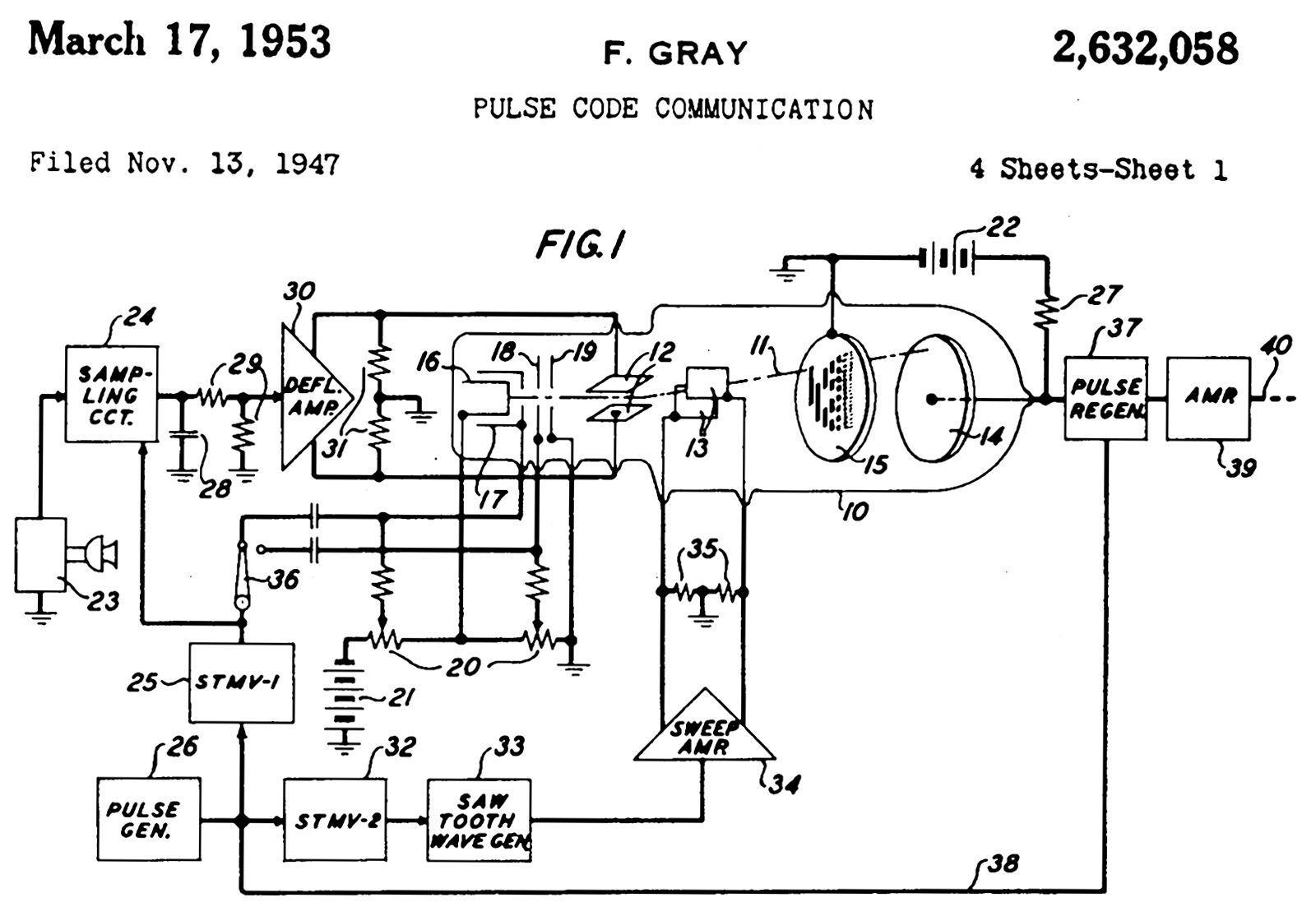
Part of front page of Gray's patent, showing PCM tube (10) with reflected binary code in plate (15)

Gray was most interested in using the codes to minimize errors in converting analog signals to digital; his codes are still used today for this purpose.

=== Position encoders ===
Rotary encoder for angle-measuring devices marked in 3-bit binary-reflected Gray code (BRGC)

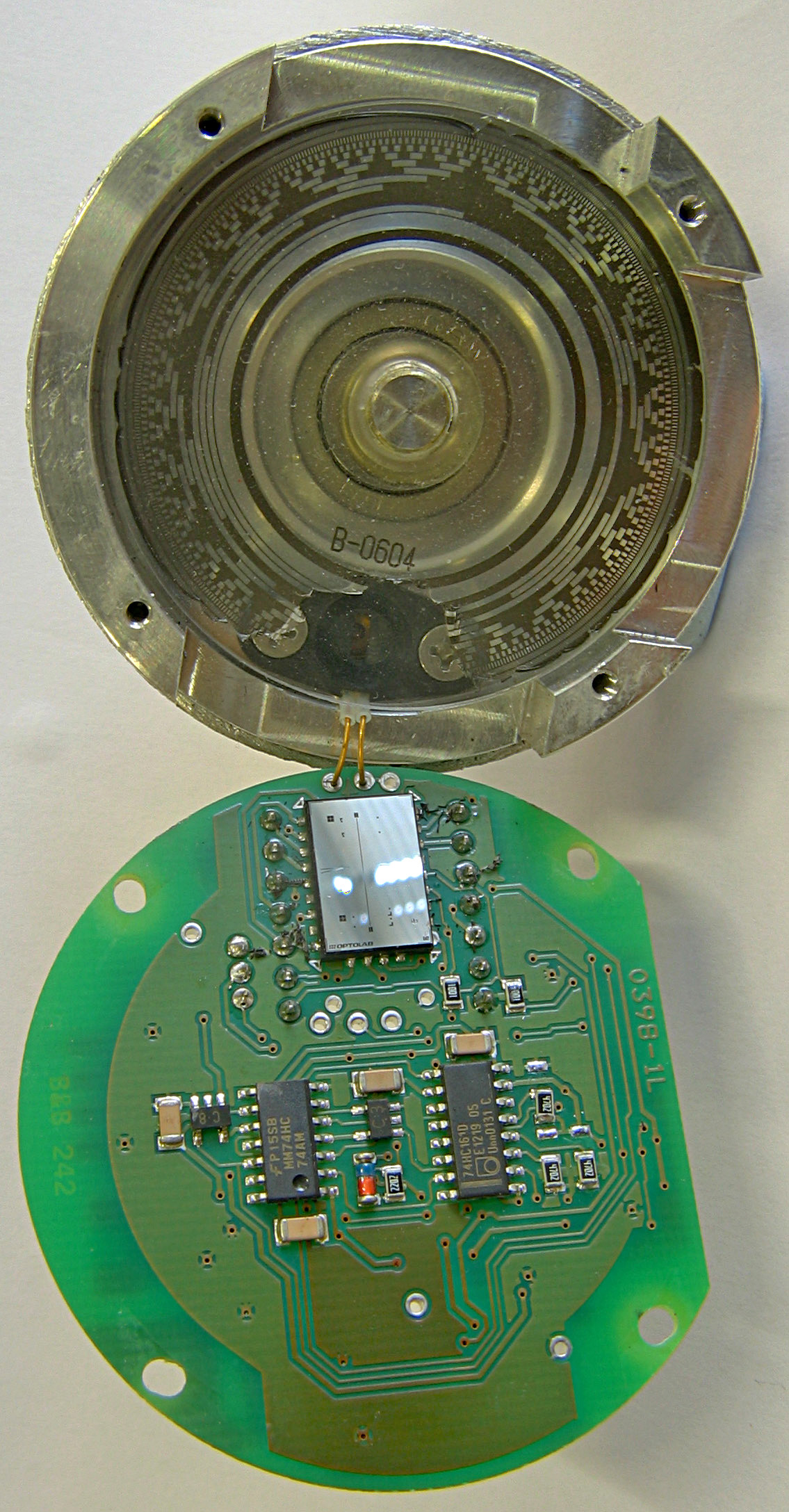
A Gray code absolute rotary encoder with 13 tracks. Housing, interrupter disk, and light source are in the top; sensing element and support components are in the bottom.

Gray codes are used in linear and rotary position encoders (absolute encoders and quadrature encoders) in preference to weighted binary encoding. This avoids the possibility that, when multiple bits change in the binary representation of a position, a misread will result from some of the bits changing before others.

For example, some rotary encoders provide a disk which has an electrically conductive Gray code pattern on concentric rings (tracks). Each track has a stationary metal spring contact that provides electrical contact to the conductive code pattern. Together, these contacts produce output signals in the form of a Gray code. Other encoders employ non-contact mechanisms based on optical or magnetic sensors to produce the Gray code output signals.

Regardless of the mechanism or precision of a moving encoder, position measurement error can occur at specific positions (at code boundaries) because the code may be changing at the exact moment it is read (sampled). A binary output code could cause significant position measurement errors because it is impossible to make all bits change at exactly the same time. If, at the moment the position is sampled, some bits have changed and others have not, the sampled position will be incorrect. In the case of absolute encoders, the indicated position may be far away from the actual position and, in the case of incremental encoders, this can corrupt position tracking.

In contrast, the Gray code used by position encoders ensures that the codes for any two consecutive positions will differ by only one bit and, consequently, only one bit can change at a time. In this case, the maximum position error will be small, indicating a position adjacent to the actual position.

=== Genetic algorithms ===
Due to the Hamming distance properties of Gray codes, they are sometimes used in genetic algorithms. They may be useful in this field because mutations in the code allow for mostly incremental changes, but occasionally a single bit-change can cause a big leap and lead to new properties.

=== Boolean circuit minimization ===
Gray codes are also used in labelling the axes of Karnaugh maps since 1953 as well as in Händler circle graphs since 1958, both graphical methods for logic circuit minimization.

=== Error correction ===
In modern digital communications, 1D- and 2D-Gray codes play an important role in error prevention before applying an error correction. For example, in a digital modulation scheme such as QAM where data is typically transmitted in symbols of 4 bits or more, the signal's constellation diagram is arranged so that the bit patterns conveyed by adjacent constellation points differ by only one bit. By combining this with forward error correction capable of correcting single-bit errors, it is possible for a receiver to correct any transmission errors that cause a constellation point to deviate into the area of an adjacent point. This makes the transmission system less susceptible to noise.

Codes 4-PSK

Codes 8-PSK

Codes 16-QAM

=== Communication between clock domains ===
Digital logic designers use Gray codes extensively for passing multi-bit count information between synchronous logic that operates at different clock frequencies. The logic is considered operating in different "clock domains". It is fundamental to the design of large chips that operate with many different clocking frequencies.

=== Cycling through states with minimal effort ===
If a system has to cycle sequentially through all possible combinations of on-off states of some set of controls, and the changes of the controls require non-trivial expense (e.g. time, wear, human work), a Gray code minimizes the number of setting changes to just one change for each combination of states. An example would be testing a piping system for all combinations of settings of its manually operated valves.

A balanced Gray code can be constructed, that flips every bit equally often. Since bit-flips are evenly distributed, this is optimal in the following way: balanced Gray codes minimize the maximal count of bit-flips for each digit.

==== Gray code counters and arithmetic ====
George R. Stibitz utilized a reflected binary code in a binary pulse counting device in 1941.

A typical use of Gray code counters is building a FIFO (first-in, first-out) data buffer that has read and write ports that exist in different clock domains. The input and output counters inside such a dual-port FIFO are often stored using Gray code to prevent invalid transient states from being captured when the count crosses clock domains. The updated read and write pointers need to be passed between clock domains when they change, to be able to track FIFO empty and full status in each domain. Each bit of the pointers is sampled non-deterministically for this clock domain transfer. So for each bit, either the old value or the new value is propagated. Therefore, if more than one bit in the multi-bit pointer is changing at the sampling point, a "wrong" binary value (neither new nor old) can be propagated. By guaranteeing only one bit can be changing, Gray codes guarantee that the only possible sampled values are the new or old multi-bit value. Typically Gray codes of power-of-two length are used.

Sometimes digital buses in electronic systems are used to convey quantities that can only increase or decrease by one at a time, for example the output of an event counter which is being passed between clock domains or to a digital-to-analog converter. The advantage of Gray codes in these applications is that differences in the propagation delays of the many wires that represent the bits of the code cannot cause the received value to go through states that are out of the Gray code sequence. This is similar to the advantage of Gray codes in the construction of mechanical encoders, however the source of the Gray code is an electronic counter in this case. The counter itself must count in Gray code, or if the counter runs in binary then the output value from the counter must be reclocked after it has been converted to Gray code, because when a value is converted from binary to Gray code, (Note: By applying a simple inversion rule, the Gray code and the O'Brien code I can be translated into the 8421 pure binary code and the 2421 Aiken code, respectively, to ease arithmetic operations.^{[C]}) it is possible that differences in the arrival times of the binary data bits into the binary-to-Gray conversion circuit will mean that the code could go briefly through states that are wildly out of sequence. Adding a clocked register after the circuit that converts the count value to Gray code may introduce a clock cycle of latency, so counting directly in Gray code may be advantageous.

To produce the next count value in a Gray-code counter, it is necessary to have some combinational logic that will increment the current count value that is stored. One way to increment a Gray code number is to convert it into ordinary binary code, add one to it with a standard binary adder, and then convert the result back to Gray code. Other methods of counting in Gray code are discussed in a report by Robert W. Doran, including taking the output from the first latches of the master-slave flip flops in a binary ripple counter.

==== Gray code addressing ====
As the execution of executable code typically causes an instruction memory access pattern of locally consecutive addresses, bus encodings using Gray code addressing instead of binary addressing can reduce the number of state changes of the address bits significantly, thereby reducing the CPU power consumption in some low-power designs.

==== Evenness and oddness of Gray codes ====
In the natural binary code system, the least significant bit indicates if the number is even (0) or odd (1), a property absent in the Gray code. Because just one bit is changed in consecutive Gray codes, the number of 1 bits will alternate between even and odd, so, to check a Gray code's evenness, it's necessary to count them, that is, an even number of 1s means the Gray code is even:

Decimal	Binary	Evenness	Binary bit count	Gray	Gray bit count
0	0000	even	0	0000	0
1	0001	odd	1	0001	1
2	0010	even	1	0011	2
3	0011	odd	2	0010	1
4	0100	even	1	0110	2
5	0101	odd	2	0111	3
6	0110	even	2	0101	2
7	0111	odd	3	0100	1
8	1000	even	1	1100	2
9	1001	odd	2	1101	3
10	1010	even	2	1111	4
11	1011	odd	3	1110	3
12	1100	even	2	1010	2
13	1101	odd	3	1011	3
14	1110	even	3	1001	2
15	1111	odd	4	1000	1

Some processors, like Zilog's Z80, Japan ASCII's R800, and Intel's 8086, have parity status flags, which indicate bitwise evenness of some registers, facilitating checking if the number of up bits in them is even.

== Constructing an n-bit Gray code ==
The first few steps of the reflect-and-prefix method.

4-bit Gray code permutation

The binary-reflected Gray code list for n bits can be generated recursively from the list for n − 1 bits by reflecting the list (i.e. listing the entries in reverse order), prefixing the entries in the original list with a binary 0, prefixing the entries in the reflected list with a binary 1, and then concatenating the original list with the reversed list. For example, generating the n = 3 list from the n = 2 list:

2-bit list:	00, 01, 11, 10
Reflected:		10, 11, 01, 00
Prefix old entries with 0:	000, 001, 011, 010,
Prefix new entries with 1:		110, 111, 101, 100
Concatenated:	000, 001, 011, 010,	110, 111, 101, 100

The one-bit Gray code is G_{1} = (0,1). This can be thought of as built recursively as above from a zero-bit Gray code G_{0} = ( Λ ) consisting of a single entry of zero length. This iterative process of generating G_{n+1} from G_{n} makes the following properties of the standard reflecting code clear:

- G_{n} is a permutation of the numbers 0, ..., 2^{n} − 1. (Each number appears exactly once in the list.)
- G_{n} is embedded as the first half of G_{n+1}.
- Therefore, the coding is stable, in the sense that once a binary number appears in G_{n} it appears in the same position in all longer lists; so it makes sense to talk about the reflective Gray code value of a number: G(m) = the mth reflecting Gray code, counting from 0.
- Each entry in G_{n} differs by only one bit from the previous entry. (The Hamming distance is 1.)
- The last entry in G_{n} differs by only one bit from the first entry. (The code is cyclic.)

These characteristics suggest a simple and fast method of translating a binary value into the corresponding Gray code. Each bit is inverted if the next higher bit of the input value is set to one. This can be performed in parallel by a bit-shift and exclusive-or operation if they are available: the nth Gray code is obtained by computing $n \oplus \left\lfloor \tfrac{n}{2} \right\rfloor$. Prepending a 0 bit leaves the order of the code words unchanged, prepending a 1 bit reverses the order of the code words. If the bits at position $i$ of codewords are inverted, the order of neighbouring blocks of $2^i$ codewords is reversed. For example, if bit 0 is inverted in a 3 bit codeword sequence, the order of two neighbouring codewords is reversed

000,001,010,011,100,101,110,111 → 001,000,011,010,101,100,111,110 (invert bit 0)

If bit 1 is inverted, blocks of 2 codewords change order:

000,001,010,011,100,101,110,111 → 010,011,000,001,110,111,100,101 (invert bit 1)

If bit 2 is inverted, blocks of 4 codewords reverse order:

000,001,010,011,100,101,110,111 → 100,101,110,111,000,001,010,011 (invert bit 2)

Thus, performing an exclusive or on a bit $b_i$ at position $i$ with the bit $b_{i+1}$ at position $i+1$ leaves the order of codewords intact if $b_{i+1} = \mathtt{0}$, and reverses the order of blocks of $2^{i+1}$ codewords if $b_{i+1} = \mathtt{1}$. Now, this is exactly the same operation as the reflect-and-prefix method to generate the Gray code.

A similar method can be used to perform the reverse translation, but the computation of each bit depends on the computed value of the next higher bit so it cannot be performed in parallel. Assuming $g_i$ is the $i$th Gray-coded bit ($g_0$ being the most significant bit), and $b_i$ is the $i$th binary-coded bit ($b_0$ being the most-significant bit), the reverse translation can be given recursively: $b_0 = g_0$, and $b_i=g_i \oplus b_{i-1}$. Alternatively, decoding a Gray code into a binary number can be described as a prefix sum of the bits in the Gray code, where each individual summation operation in the prefix sum is performed modulo two.

To construct the binary-reflected Gray code iteratively, at step 0 start with the $\mathrm{code}_0 = \mathtt{0}$, and at step $i > 0$ find the bit position of the least significant 1 in the binary representation of $i$ and flip the bit at that position in the previous code $\mathrm{code}_{i-1}$ to get the next code $\mathrm{code}_i$. The bit positions start 0, 1, 0, 2, 0, 1, 0, 3, ... (Note: Sequence 0, 1, 0, 2, 0, 1, 0, 3, … (sequence A007814 in the OEIS).) See find first set for efficient algorithms to compute these values.

== Converting to and from Gray code ==
The following functions in C convert between binary numbers and their associated Gray codes. While it may seem that Gray-to-binary conversion requires each bit to be handled one at a time, faster algorithms exist.

typedef unsigned int uint;

// This function converts an unsigned binary number to reflected binary Gray code.
uint BinaryToGray(uint num)
{
    return num ^ (num >> 1); // The operator >> is shift right. The operator ^ is exclusive or.
}

// This function converts a reflected binary Gray code number to a binary number.
uint GrayToBinary(uint num)
{
    uint mask = num;
    while (mask) {           // Each Gray code bit is exclusive-ored with all more significant bits.
        mask >>= 1;
        num   ^= mask;
    }
    return num;
}

// A more efficient version for Gray codes 32 bits or fewer through the use of SWAR (SIMD within a register) techniques. 
// It implements a parallel prefix XOR function. The assignment statements can be in any order.
// 
// This function can be adapted for longer Gray codes by adding steps.

uint GrayToBinary32(uint num)
{
    num ^= num >> 16;
    num ^= num >>  8;
    num ^= num >>  4;
    num ^= num >>  2;
    num ^= num >>  1;
    return num;
}
// A Four-bit-at-once variant changes a binary number (abcd)2 to (abcd)2 ^ (00ab)2, then to (abcd)2 ^ (00ab)2 ^ (0abc)2 ^ (000a)2.

On newer processors, the number of ALU instructions in the decoding step can be reduced by taking advantage of the CLMUL instruction set. If MASK is the constant binary string of ones ended with a single zero digit, then carryless multiplication of MASK with the Gray encoding of x will always give either x or its bitwise negation.

== Special types of Gray codes ==
In practice, "Gray code" almost always refers to a binary-reflected Gray code (BRGC). However, mathematicians have discovered other kinds of Gray codes. Like BRGCs, each consists of a list of words, where each word differs from the next in only one digit (each word has a Hamming distance of 1 from the next word).

=== Gray codes with n bits and of length less than 2^{n} ===
It is possible to construct binary Gray codes with n bits with a length of less than 2^{n}, if the length is even. One possibility is to start with a balanced Gray code and remove pairs of values at either the beginning and the end, or in the middle. OEIS sequence A290772 gives the number of possible Gray sequences of length 2n that include zero and use the minimum number of bits.

=== n-ary Gray code ===
Ternary number → ternary Gray code

0 → 000
1 → 001
2 → 002
10 → 012
11 → 011
12 → 010
20 → 020
21 → 021
22 → 022
100 → 122
101 → 121
102 → 120
110 → 110
111 → 111
112 → 112
120 → 102
121 → 101
122 → 100
200 → 200
201 → 201
202 → 202
210 → 212
211 → 211
212 → 210
220 → 220
221 → 221

222 → 222

There are many specialized types of Gray codes other than the binary-reflected Gray code. One such type of Gray code is the n-ary Gray code, also known as a non-Boolean Gray code. As the name implies, this type of Gray code uses non-Boolean values in its encodings.

For example, a 3-ary (ternary) Gray code would use the values 0,1,2. The (n, k)-Gray code is the n-ary Gray code with k digits. The sequence of elements in the (3, 2)-Gray code is: 00,01,02,12,11,10,20,21,22. The (n, k)-Gray code may be constructed recursively, as the BRGC, or may be constructed iteratively. An algorithm to iteratively generate the (N, k)-Gray code is presented (in C):

// inputs: base, digits, value
// output: Gray
// Convert a value to a Gray code with the given base and digits.
// Iterating through a sequence of values would result in a sequence
// of Gray codes in which only one digit changes at a time.
void toGray(unsigned base, unsigned digits, unsigned value, unsigned gray[digits])
{ 
	unsigned baseN[digits];	// Stores the ordinary base-N number, one digit per entry
	unsigned i;		// The loop variable
 
	// Put the normal baseN number into the baseN array. For base 10, 109 
	// would be stored as [9,0,1]
	for (i = 0; i < digits; i++) {
		baseN[i] = value % base;
		value    = value / base;
	}
 
	// Convert the normal baseN number into the Gray code equivalent. Note that
	// the loop starts at the most significant digit and goes down.
	unsigned shift = 0;
	while (i--) {
		// The Gray digit gets shifted down by the sum of the higher
		// digits.
		gray[i] = (baseN[i] + shift) % base;
		shift = shift + base - gray[i];	// Subtract from base so shift is positive
	}
}
// EXAMPLES
// input: value = 1899, base = 10, digits = 4
// output: baseN[] = [9,9,8,1], gray[] = [0,1,7,1]
// input: value = 1900, base = 10, digits = 4
// output: baseN[] = [0,0,9,1], gray[] = [0,1,8,1]

There are other Gray code algorithms for (n, k)-Gray codes. The (n, k)-Gray code produced by the above algorithm is always cyclical; some algorithms, such as that by Guan, lack this property when k is odd. On the other hand, while only one digit at a time changes with this method, it can change by wrapping (looping from n − 1 to 0). In Guan's algorithm, the count alternately rises and falls, so that the numeric difference between two Gray code digits is always one.

Gray codes are not uniquely defined, because a permutation of the columns of such a code is a Gray code too. The above procedure produces a code in which the lower the significance of a digit, the more often it changes, making it similar to normal counting methods.

See also skew binary number system, a variant ternary number system where at most two digits change on each increment, as each increment can be done with at most one digit carry operation.

=== Balanced Gray code ===
Although the binary reflected Gray code is useful in many scenarios, it is not optimal in certain cases because of a lack of "uniformity". In balanced Gray codes, the number of changes in different coordinate positions are as close as possible. To make this more precise, let G be an R-ary complete Gray cycle having transition sequence $(\delta_k)$; the transition counts (spectrum) of G are the collection of integers defined by

$$\lambda_k = |\{ j \in \mathbb{Z}_{R^n} : \delta_j = k \}| \, , \text { for } k \in \mathbb{Z}_n$$

A Gray code is uniform or uniformly balanced if its transition counts are all equal, in which case we have $\lambda_k = \tfrac{R^n}{n}$ for all k. Clearly, when $R = 2$, such codes exist only if n is a power of 2. If n is not a power of 2, it is possible to construct well-balanced binary codes where the difference between two transition counts is at most 2; so that (combining both cases) every transition count is either $2\left\lfloor \tfrac{2^n}{2n} \right\rfloor$ or $2\left\lceil \tfrac{2^n}{2n} \right\rceil$. Gray codes can also be exponentially balanced if all of their transition counts are adjacent powers of two, and such codes exist for every power of two.

For example, a balanced 4-bit Gray code has 16 transitions, which can be evenly distributed among all four positions (four transitions per position), making it uniformly balanced:

0 1 1 1 1 1 1 0 0 0 0 0 0 1 1 0
0 0 1 1 1 1 0 0 1 1 1 1 0 0 0 0
0 0 0 0 1 1 1 1 1 0 0 1 1 1 0 0
0 0 0 1 1 0 0 0 0 0 1 1 1 1 1 1

whereas a balanced 5-bit Gray code has a total of 32 transitions, which cannot be evenly distributed among the positions. In this example, four positions have six transitions each, and one has eight:

1 1 1 1 1 0 0 0 0 1 1 1 1 1 1 0 0 1 1 1 1 1 0 0 0 0 0 0 0 0 0 0
0 0 0 1 1 1 1 1 1 1 1 0 0 0 0 0 0 0 1 1 1 1 1 1 0 0 0 1 1 0 0 0
1 1 0 0 1 1 1 0 0 0 0 0 0 1 1 1 0 0 0 1 1 1 1 1 1 0 0 0 0 0 1 1
1 0 0 0 0 0 0 0 1 1 1 1 1 1 0 0 0 0 0 0 1 1 1 1 1 1 1 1 0 0 0 1
1 1 1 1 1 1 0 0 0 0 1 1 0 0 0 0 0 0 0 0 0 1 1 0 0 0 1 1 1 1 1 1

We will now show a construction and implementation for well-balanced binary Gray codes which allows us to generate an n-digit balanced Gray code for every n. The main principle is to inductively construct an (n + 2)-digit Gray code $G'$ given an n-digit Gray code G in such a way that the balanced property is preserved. To do this, we consider partitions of $G = g_0, \ldots, g_{2^n-1}$ into an even number L of non-empty blocks of the form

$$\left\{g_0\right\}, \left\{g_1, \ldots, g_{k_2}\right\}, \left\{g_{k_2+1}, \ldots, g_{k_3}\right\}, \ldots, \left\{g_{k_{L-2}+1}, \ldots, g_{-2}\right\}, \left\{g_{-1}\right\}$$

where $k_1 = 0$, $k_{L-1} = -2$, and $k_{L} \equiv -1 \pmod{2^n}$). This partition induces an $(n+2)$-digit Gray code given by

$$\begin{align}
&\mathtt{00}g_0,\\
&\mathtt{00}g_1, \ldots, \mathtt{00}g_{k_2}, \mathtt{01}g_{k_2}, \ldots, \mathtt{01}g_1, \mathtt{11}g_1, \ldots, \mathtt{11}g_{k_2}, \\
&\mathtt{11}g_{k_2+1}, \ldots, \mathtt{11}g_{k_3}, \mathtt{01}g_{k_3}, \ldots, \mathtt{01}g_{k_2+1}, \mathtt{00}g_{k_2+1}, \ldots, \mathtt{00}g_{k_3}, \ldots,\\
&\mathtt{00}g_{-2}, \mathtt{00}g_{-1}, \mathtt{10}g_{-1}, \mathtt{10}g_{-2}, \ldots, \mathtt{10}g_0, \mathtt{11}g_0, \mathtt{11}g_{-1}, \mathtt{01}g_{-1}, \mathtt{01}g_0
\end{align}$$

If we define the transition multiplicities

$$m_i = \left|\left\{ j : \delta_{k_j} = i, 1 \leq j \leq L \right\}\right|$$

to be the number of times the digit in position i changes between consecutive blocks in a partition, then for the (n + 2)-digit Gray code induced by this partition the transition spectrum $\lambda'_i$ is

$$\lambda'_i = \begin{cases}
4 \lambda_i - 2 m_i, & \text{if } 0 \leq i < n \\
L, & \text{ otherwise }
\end{cases}$$

The delicate part of this construction is to find an adequate partitioning of a balanced n-digit Gray code such that the code induced by it remains balanced, but for this only the transition multiplicities matter; joining two consecutive blocks over a digit $i$ transition and splitting another block at another digit $i$ transition produces a different Gray code with exactly the same transition spectrum $\lambda'_i$, so one may for example designate the first $m_i$ transitions at digit $i$ as those that fall between two blocks. Uniform codes can be found when $R \equiv 0 \pmod 4$ and $R^n \equiv 0 \pmod n$, and this construction can be extended to the R-ary case as well.

=== Long run Gray codes ===
Long run (or maximum gap) Gray codes maximize the distance between consecutive changes of digits in the same position. That is, the minimum run-length of any bit remains unchanged for as long as possible.

=== Monotonic Gray codes ===
Monotonic codes are useful in the theory of interconnection networks, especially for minimizing dilation for linear arrays of processors. If we define the weight of a binary string to be the number of 1s in the string, then although we clearly cannot have a Gray code with strictly increasing weight, we may want to approximate this by having the code run through two adjacent weights before reaching the next one.

We can formalize the concept of monotone Gray codes as follows: consider the partition of the hypercube $Q_n = (V_n, E_n)$ into levels of vertices that have equal weight, i.e.

$$V_n(i) = \{ v \in V_n : v \text{ has weight } i \}$$

for $0 \leq i \leq n$. These levels satisfy $|V_n(i)| = \textstyle\binom{n}{i}$. Let $Q_n(i)$ be the subgraph of $Q_n$ induced by $V_n(i) \cup V_n(i+1)$, and let $E_n(i)$ be the edges in $Q_n(i)$. A monotonic Gray code is then a Hamiltonian path in $Q_n$ such that whenever $\delta_1 \in E_n(i)$ comes before $\delta_2 \in E_n(j)$ in the path, then $i \leq j$.

An elegant construction of monotonic n-digit Gray codes for any n is based on the idea of recursively building subpaths $P_{n,j}$ of length $2 \textstyle\binom{n}{j}$ having edges in $E_n(j)$. We define $P_{1,0} = (\mathtt{0}, \mathtt{1})$, $P_{n,j} = \emptyset$ whenever $j < 0$ or $j \geq n$, and

$$P_{n+1,j} = \mathtt{1}P^{\pi_n}_{n,j-1}, \mathtt{0}P_{n,j}$$

otherwise. Here, $\pi_n$ is a suitably defined permutation and $P^{\pi}$ refers to the path P with its coordinates permuted by $\pi$. These paths give rise to two monotonic n-digit Gray codes $G_n^{(1)}$ and $G_n^{(2)}$ given by

$$G_n^{(1)} = P_{n,0} P_{n,1}^R P_{n,2} P_{n,3}^R \cdots \text{ and } G_n^{(2)} = P_{n,0}^R P_{n,1} P_{n,2}^R P_{n,3} \cdots$$

The choice of $\pi_n$ which ensures that these codes are indeed Gray codes turns out to be $\pi_n = E^{-1}\left(\pi_{n-1}^2\right)$. The first few values of $P_{n,j}$ are shown in the table below.

Subpaths in the Savage–Winkler algorithm
$P_{n,j}$	j = 0	j = 1	j = 2	j = 3
n = 1	0, 1			
n = 2	00, 01	10, 11		
n = 3	000, 001	100, 110, 010, 011	101, 111	
n = 4	0000, 0001	1000, 1100, 0100, 0110, 0010, 0011	1010, 1011, 1001, 1101, 0101, 0111	1110, 1111

These monotonic Gray codes can be efficiently implemented in such a way that each subsequent element can be generated in O(n) time. The algorithm is most easily described using coroutines.

Monotonic codes have an interesting connection to the Lovász conjecture, which states that every connected vertex-transitive graph contains a Hamiltonian path. The "middle-level" subgraph $Q_{2n+1}(n)$ is vertex-transitive (that is, its automorphism group is transitive, so that each vertex has the same "local environment" and cannot be differentiated from the others, since we can relabel the coordinates as well as the binary digits to obtain an automorphism) and the problem of finding a Hamiltonian path in this subgraph is called the "middle-levels problem", which can provide insights into the more general conjecture. The question has been answered affirmatively for $n \leq 15$, and the preceding construction for monotonic codes ensures a Hamiltonian path of length at least 0.839N, where N is the number of vertices in the middle-level subgraph.

=== Beckett–Gray code ===
Another type of Gray code, the Beckett–Gray code, is named for Irish playwright Samuel Beckett, who was interested in symmetry. His play "Quad" features four actors and is divided into sixteen time periods. Each period ends with one of the four actors entering or leaving the stage. The play begins and ends with an empty stage, and Beckett wanted each subset of actors to appear on stage exactly once. Clearly the set of actors currently on stage can be represented by a 4-bit binary Gray code. Beckett, however, placed an additional restriction on the script: he wished the actors to enter and exit so that the actor who had been on stage the longest would always be the one to exit. The actors could then be represented by a FIFO queue, so that (of the actors onstage) the actor being dequeued is always the one who was enqueued first. Beckett was unable to find a Beckett–Gray code for his play, and indeed, an exhaustive listing of all possible sequences reveals that no such code exists for n = 4. It is known today that such codes do exist for n = 2, 5, 6, 7, and 8, and do not exist for n = 3 or 4. An example of an 8-bit Beckett–Gray code can be found in Donald Knuth's Art of Computer Programming. According to Sawada and Wong, the search space for n = 6 can be explored in 15 hours, and more than 9500 solutions for the case n = 7 have been found.

=== Snake-in-the-box codes ===
Maximum lengths of snakes (L_{s}) and coils (L_{c}) in the snakes-in-the-box problem for dimensions n from 1 to 4

Snake-in-the-box codes, or snakes, are the sequences of nodes of induced paths in an n-dimensional hypercube graph, and coil-in-the-box codes, or coils, are the sequences of nodes of induced cycles in a hypercube. Viewed as Gray codes, these sequences have the property of being able to detect any single-bit coding error. Codes of this type were first described by William H. Kautz in the late 1950s; since then, there has been much research on finding the code with the largest possible number of codewords for a given hypercube dimension.

=== Single-track Gray code ===
Yet another kind of Gray code is the single-track Gray code (STGC) developed by Norman B. Spedding and refined by Hiltgen, Paterson and Brandestini in Single-track Gray Codes (1996). The STGC is a cyclical list of P unique binary encodings of length n such that two consecutive words differ in exactly one position, and when the list is examined as a P × n matrix, each column is a cyclic shift of the first column.

Animated and color-coded version of the STGC rotor.

The name comes from their use with rotary encoders, where a number of tracks are being sensed by contacts, resulting for each in an output of 0 or 1. To reduce noise due to different contacts not switching at exactly the same moment in time, one preferably sets up the tracks so that the data output by the contacts are in Gray code. To get high angular accuracy, one needs lots of contacts; in order to achieve at least 1° accuracy, one needs at least 360 distinct positions per revolution, which requires a minimum of 9 bits of data, and thus the same number of contacts.

If all contacts are placed at the same angular position, then 9 tracks are needed to get a standard BRGC with at least 1° accuracy. However, if the manufacturer moves a contact to a different angular position (but at the same distance from the center shaft), then the corresponding "ring pattern" needs to be rotated the same angle to give the same output. If the most significant bit (the inner ring in Figure 1) is rotated enough, it exactly matches the next ring out. Since both rings are then identical, the inner ring can be cut out, and the sensor for that ring moved to the remaining, identical ring (but offset at that angle from the other sensor on that ring). Those two sensors on a single ring make a quadrature encoder. That reduces the number of tracks for a "1° resolution" angular encoder to 8 tracks. Reducing the number of tracks still further cannot be done with BRGC.

For many years, Torsten Sillke and other mathematicians believed that it was impossible to encode position on a single track such that consecutive positions differed at only a single sensor, except for the 2-sensor, 1-track quadrature encoder. So for applications where 8 tracks were too bulky, people used single-track incremental encoders (quadrature encoders) or 2-track "quadrature encoder + reference notch" encoders.

Norman B. Spedding, however, registered a patent in 1994 with several examples showing that it was possible. Although it is not possible to distinguish 2^{n} positions with n sensors on a single track, it is possible to distinguish close to that many. Etzion and Paterson conjecture that when n is itself a power of 2, n sensors can distinguish at most 2^{n} − 2n positions and that for prime n the limit is 2^{n} − 2 positions. The authors went on to generate a 504-position single track code of length 9 which they believe is optimal. Since this number is larger than 2^{8} = 256, more than 8 sensors are required by any code, although a BRGC could distinguish 512 positions with 9 sensors.

An STGC for P = 30 and n = 5 is reproduced here:

Single-track Gray code for 30 positions
Angle	Code	Angle	Code	Angle	Code	Angle	Code	Angle	Code
0°	10000	72°	01000	144°	00100	216°	00010	288°	00001
12°	10100	84°	01010	156°	00101	228°	10010	300°	01001
24°	11100	96°	01110	168°	00111	240°	10011	312°	11001
36°	11110	108°	01111	180°	10111	252°	11011	324°	11101
48°	11010	120°	01101	192°	10110	264°	01011	336°	10101
60°	11000	132°	01100	204°	00110	276°	00011	348°	10001

Each column is a cyclic shift of the first column, and from any row to the next row only one bit changes. The single-track nature (like a code chain) is useful in the fabrication of these wheels (compared to BRGC), as only one track is needed, thus reducing their cost and size. The Gray code nature is useful (compared to chain codes, also called De Bruijn sequences), as only one sensor will change at any one time, so the uncertainty during a transition between two discrete states will only be plus or minus one unit of angular measurement the device is capable of resolving.

9-bit, single-track Gray code, displaying one degree angular resolution.

Since this 30 degree example was added, there has been a lot of interest in examples with higher angular resolution. In 2008, Gary Williams, based on previous work, discovered a 9-bit single track Gray code that gives a 1 degree resolution. This Gray code was used to design an actual device which was published on the site Thingiverse. This device was designed by etzenseep (Florian Bauer) in September 2022.

An STGC for P = 360 and n = 9 is reproduced here:

Single-track Gray code for 360 positions
Angle	Code	Angle	Code	Angle	Code	Angle	Code	Angle	Code	Angle	Code	Angle	Code	Angle	Code	Angle	Code
0°	100000001	40°	000000011	80°	000000110	120°	000001100	160°	000011000	200°	000110000	240°	001100000	280°	011000000	320°	110000000
1°	110000001	41°	100000011	81°	000000111	121°	000001110	161°	000011100	201°	000111000	241°	001110000	281°	011100000	321°	111000000
2°	111000001	42°	110000011	82°	100000111	122°	000001111	162°	000011110	202°	000111100	242°	001111000	282°	011110000	322°	111100000
3°	111000011	43°	110000111	83°	100001111	123°	000011111	163°	000111110	203°	001111100	243°	011111000	283°	111110000	323°	111100001
4°	111000111	44°	110001111	84°	100011111	124°	000111111	164°	001111110	204°	011111100	244°	111111000	284°	111110001	324°	111100011
5°	111001111	45°	110011111	85°	100111111	125°	001111111	165°	011111110	205°	111111100	245°	111111001	285°	111110011	325°	111100111
6°	111011111	46°	110111111	86°	101111111	126°	011111111	166°	111111110	206°	111111101	246°	111111011	286°	111110111	326°	111101111
7°	111011011	47°	110110111	87°	101101111	127°	011011111	167°	110111110	207°	101111101	247°	011111011	287°	111110110	327°	111101101
8°	101011011	48°	010110111	88°	101101110	128°	011011101	168°	110111010	208°	101110101	248°	011101011	288°	111010110	328°	110101101
9°	101011111	49°	010111111	89°	101111110	129°	011111101	169°	111111010	209°	111110101	249°	111101011	289°	111010111	329°	110101111
10°	101011101	50°	010111011	90°	101110110	130°	011101101	170°	111011010	210°	110110101	250°	101101011	290°	011010111	330°	110101110
11°	101010101	51°	010101011	91°	101010110	131°	010101101	171°	101011010	211°	010110101	251°	101101010	291°	011010101	331°	110101010
12°	101010111	52°	010101111	92°	101011110	132°	010111101	172°	101111010	212°	011110101	252°	111101010	292°	111010101	332°	110101011
13°	101110111	53°	011101111	93°	111011110	133°	110111101	173°	101111011	213°	011110111	253°	111101110	293°	111011101	333°	110111011
14°	001110111	54°	011101110	94°	111011100	134°	110111001	174°	101110011	214°	011100111	254°	111001110	294°	110011101	334°	100111011
15°	001010111	55°	010101110	95°	101011100	135°	010111001	175°	101110010	215°	011100101	255°	111001010	295°	110010101	335°	100101011
16°	001011111	56°	010111110	96°	101111100	136°	011111001	176°	111110010	216°	111100101	256°	111001011	296°	110010111	336°	100101111
17°	001011011	57°	010110110	97°	101101100	137°	011011001	177°	110110010	217°	101100101	257°	011001011	297°	110010110	337°	100101101
18°	001011001	58°	010110010	98°	101100100	138°	011001001	178°	110010010	218°	100100101	258°	001001011	298°	010010110	338°	100101100
19°	001111001	59°	011110010	99°	111100100	139°	111001001	179°	110010011	219°	100100111	259°	001001111	299°	010011110	339°	100111100
20°	001111101	60°	011111010	100°	111110100	140°	111101001	180°	111010011	220°	110100111	260°	101001111	300°	010011111	340°	100111110
21°	000111101	61°	001111010	101°	011110100	141°	111101000	181°	111010001	221°	110100011	261°	101000111	301°	010001111	341°	100011110
22°	000110101	62°	001101010	102°	011010100	142°	110101000	182°	101010001	222°	010100011	262°	101000110	302°	010001101	342°	100011010
23°	000100101	63°	001001010	103°	010010100	143°	100101000	183°	001010001	223°	010100010	263°	101000100	303°	010001001	343°	100010010
24°	000101101	64°	001011010	104°	010110100	144°	101101000	184°	011010001	224°	110100010	264°	101000101	304°	010001011	344°	100010110
25°	000101001	65°	001010010	105°	010100100	145°	101001000	185°	010010001	225°	100100010	265°	001000101	305°	010001010	345°	100010100
26°	000111001	66°	001110010	106°	011100100	146°	111001000	186°	110010001	226°	100100011	266°	001000111	306°	010001110	346°	100011100
27°	000110001	67°	001100010	107°	011000100	147°	110001000	187°	100010001	227°	000100011	267°	001000110	307°	010001100	347°	100011000
28°	000010001	68°	000100010	108°	001000100	148°	010001000	188°	100010000	228°	000100001	268°	001000010	308°	010000100	348°	100001000
29°	000011001	69°	000110010	109°	001100100	149°	011001000	189°	110010000	229°	100100001	269°	001000011	309°	010000110	349°	100001100
30°	000001001	70°	000010010	110°	000100100	150°	001001000	190°	010010000	230°	100100000	270°	001000001	310°	010000010	350°	100000100
31°	100001001	71°	000010011	111°	000100110	151°	001001100	191°	010011000	231°	100110000	271°	001100001	311°	011000010	351°	110000100
32°	100001101	72°	000011011	112°	000110110	152°	001101100	192°	011011000	232°	110110000	272°	101100001	312°	011000011	352°	110000110
33°	100000101	73°	000001011	113°	000010110	153°	000101100	193°	001011000	233°	010110000	273°	101100000	313°	011000001	353°	110000010
34°	110000101	74°	100001011	114°	000010111	154°	000101110	194°	001011100	234°	010111000	274°	101110000	314°	011100001	354°	111000010
35°	010000101	75°	100001010	115°	000010101	155°	000101010	195°	001010100	235°	010101000	275°	101010000	315°	010100001	355°	101000010
36°	010000111	76°	100001110	116°	000011101	156°	000111010	196°	001110100	236°	011101000	276°	111010000	316°	110100001	356°	101000011
37°	010000011	77°	100000110	117°	000001101	157°	000011010	197°	000110100	237°	001101000	277°	011010000	317°	110100000	357°	101000001
38°	010000001	78°	100000010	118°	000000101	158°	000001010	198°	000010100	238°	000101000	278°	001010000	318°	010100000	358°	101000000
39°	000000001	79°	000000010	119°	000000100	159°	000001000	199°	000010000	239°	000100000	279°	001000000	319°	010000000	359°	100000000

Starting and ending angles for the 20 tracks for a single-track Gray code with 9 sensors separated by 40°
Starting angle	Ending angle	Length
3	4	2
23	28	6
31	37	7
44	48	5
56	60	5
64	71	8
74	76	3
88	91	4
94	96	3
99	104	6
110	115	6
131	134	4
138	154	17
173	181	9
186	187	2
220	238	19
242	246	5
273	279	7
286	289	4
307	360	54

=== Two-dimensional Gray code ===
A Gray-coded constellation diagram for rectangular 16-QAM

Two-dimensional Gray codes are used in communication to minimize the number of bit errors in quadrature amplitude modulation (QAM) adjacent points in the constellation. In a typical encoding the horizontal and vertical adjacent constellation points differ by a single bit, and diagonal adjacent points differ by 2 bits.

Two-dimensional Gray codes also have uses in location identifications schemes, where the code would be applied to area maps such as a Mercator projection of the earth's surface and an appropriate cyclic two-dimensional distance function such as the Mannheim metric be used to calculate the distance between two encoded locations, thereby combining the characteristics of the Hamming distance with the cyclic continuation of a Mercator projection.

=== Excess Gray code ===
If a subsection of a specific codevalue is extracted from that value, for example the last 3 bits of a 4-bit Gray code, the resulting code will be an "excess Gray code". This code shows the property of counting backwards in those extracted bits if the original value is further increased, because Gray-encoded values do not show the behaviour of overflow, known from classic binary encoding, when increasing past the "highest" value.

Example: The highest 3-bit Gray code, 7, is encoded as (0)100. Adding 1 results in number 8, encoded in Gray as 1100. The last 3 bits do not overflow and count backwards if you further increase the original 4 bit code.

When working with sensors that output multiple Gray-encoded values in a serial fashion, one should therefore pay attention to whether the sensor produces those multiple values encoded in a single Gray code or as separate ones, as otherwise the values might appear to be counting backwards when an "overflow" is expected.

== Gray isometry ==
The bijective mapping { 0 ↔ 00, 1 ↔ 01, 2 ↔ 11, 3 ↔ 10 } establishes an isometry between the metric space over the finite field $\mathbb{Z}_2^2$ with the metric given by the Hamming distance and the metric space over the finite ring $\mathbb{Z}_4$ (the usual modular arithmetic) with the metric given by the Lee distance. The mapping is suitably extended to an isometry of the Hamming spaces $\mathbb{Z}_2^{2m}$ and $\mathbb{Z}_4^m$. Its importance lies in establishing a correspondence between various "good" but not necessarily linear codes as Gray-map images in $\mathbb{Z}_2^2$ of ring-linear codes from $\mathbb{Z}_4$.

== Related codes ==
There are a number of binary codes similar to Gray codes, including:

- Datex codes or Giannini codes (1954), as described by Carl P. Spaulding, use a variant of O'Brien code II.
- Codes used by Varec (c. 1954), use a variant of O'Brien code I as well as base-12 and base-16 Gray code variants.
- Lucal code (1959) aka modified reflected binary code (MRB) (Note: There are several Gray code variants which are called "modified" of some sort: The Glixon code is sometimes called modified Gray code.^{[D]} The Lucal code is also called modified reflected binary code (MRB).^{[E]} The O'Brien code I or Watts code is sometimes referred to as reflected binary modified Gray code.^{[F]})
- Gillham code (1961/1962), uses a variant of Datex code and O'Brien code II.
- Leslie and Russell code (1964)
- Royal Radar Establishment code
- Hoklas code (1988)

The following binary-coded decimal (BCD) codes are Gray code variants as well:

- Petherick code (1953), (Note: By interchanging and inverting three bit rows, the O'Brien code II and the Petherick code can be transferred into each other.) also known as Royal Aircraft Establishment (RAE) code.
- O'Brien codes I and II (1955) (An O'Brien type-I code (Note: By swapping two pairs of bit rows, individually shifting four bit rows and inverting one of them, the Glixon code and the O'Brien code I can be transferred into each other.) was already described by Frederic A. Foss of IBM and used by Varec in 1954. Later, it was also known as Watts code or Watts reflected decimal (WRD) code and is sometimes ambiguously referred to as reflected binary modified Gray code. An O'Brien type-II code was already used by Datex in 1954.)
- Excess-3 Gray code (1956) (aka Gray excess-3 code, Gray 3-excess code, reflex excess-3 code, excess Gray code, Gray excess code, 10-excess-3 Gray code or Gray–Stibitz code), described by Frank P. Turvey Jr. of ITT.
- Tompkins codes I and II (1956)
- Glixon code (1957), sometimes ambiguously also called modified Gray code

4-bit unit-distance BCD codes (Note: Other unit-distance BCD codes include the non-Gray code related 5-bit Libaw–Craig and the 1-2-1 code.)
Name	Bit	0	1	2	3	4	5	6	7	8	9	Weights (Note: Depending on a code's target application, the Hamming weights of a code can be important properties beyond coding-theoretical considerations also for physical reasons. Under some circumstances the all-cleared and/or all-set states must be omitted (f.e. to avoid non-conductive or short-circuit conditions), it may be desirable to keep the highest used weight as low as possible (f.e. to reduce power consumption of the reader circuit) or to keep the variance of used weights small (f.e. to reduce acoustic noise or current fluctuations).)	Tracks	Compl.	Cyclic	5s	Comment
Gray BCD	4	0	0	0	0	0	0	0	0	1	1	0–3	4 (3 (Note: For Gray BCD, Paul and Klar codes, the number of necessary reading tracks can be reduced from 4 to 3 if inversion of one of the middle tracks is acceptable.))	No	(2, 4, 8, 16)	No	
Gray BCD	3	0	0	0	0	1	1	1	1	1	1	0–3	4 (3)	No	(2, 4, 8, 16)	No	
Gray BCD	2	0	0	1	1	1	1	0	0	0	0	0–3	4 (3)	No	(2, 4, 8, 16)	No	
Gray BCD	1	0	1	1	0	0	1	1	0	0	1	0–3	4 (3)	No	(2, 4, 8, 16)	No	
Paul	4	1	0	0	0	0	0	0	0	1	1	1–3	4 (3)	No	2, 10	No	
Paul	3	0	0	0	0	1	1	1	1	1	1	1–3	4 (3)	No	2, 10	No	
Paul	2	0	0	1	1	1	1	0	0	0	0	1–3	4 (3)	No	2, 10	No	
Paul	1	1	1	1	0	0	1	1	0	0	1	1–3	4 (3)	No	2, 10	No	
Glixon	4	0	0	0	0	0	0	0	0	1	1	0–3	4	No	2, 4, 8, 10	(shifted +1)	
Glixon	3	0	0	0	0	1	1	1	1	1	0	0–3	4	No	2, 4, 8, 10	(shifted +1)	
Glixon	2	0	0	1	1	1	1	0	0	0	0	0–3	4	No	2, 4, 8, 10	(shifted +1)	
Glixon	1	0	1	1	0	0	1	1	0	0	0	0–3	4	No	2, 4, 8, 10	(shifted +1)	
Tompkins I	4	0	0	0	0	0	1	1	1	1	1	0–4	2	No	2, 4, 10	Yes	
Tompkins I	3	0	0	0	0	1	1	1	1	1	0	0–4	2	No	2, 4, 10	Yes	
Tompkins I	2	0	0	1	1	1	1	1	0	0	0	0–4	2	No	2, 4, 10	Yes	
Tompkins I	1	0	1	1	0	0	0	1	1	0	0	0–4	2	No	2, 4, 10	Yes	
O'Brien I (Watts)	4	0	0	0	0	0	1	1	1	1	1	0–3	4	9 (Note: For O'Brien codes I and II and Petherick, Susskind, Klar as well as Excess-3 Gray codes, a 9s complement can be derived by inverting the most-significant (fourth) binary digit.)	2, 4, 10	Yes	
O'Brien I (Watts)	3	0	0	0	0	1	1	0	0	0	0	0–3	4	9	2, 4, 10	Yes	
O'Brien I (Watts)	2	0	0	1	1	1	1	1	1	0	0	0–3	4	9	2, 4, 10	Yes	
O'Brien I (Watts)	1	0	1	1	0	0	0	0	1	1	0	0–3	4	9	2, 4, 10	Yes	
Petherick (RAE)	4	0	0	0	0	0	1	1	1	1	1	1–3	3	9	2, 10	Yes	
Petherick (RAE)	3	1	0	0	0	1	1	0	0	0	1	1–3	3	9	2, 10	Yes	
Petherick (RAE)	2	0	0	1	1	1	1	1	1	0	0	1–3	3	9	2, 10	Yes	
Petherick (RAE)	1	1	1	1	0	0	0	0	1	1	1	1–3	3	9	2, 10	Yes	
O'Brien II	4	0	0	0	0	0	1	1	1	1	1	1–3	3	9	2, 10	Yes	
O'Brien II	3	0	0	0	1	1	1	1	0	0	0	1–3	3	9	2, 10	Yes	
O'Brien II	2	0	1	1	1	0	0	1	1	1	0	1–3	3	9	2, 10	Yes	
O'Brien II	1	1	1	0	0	0	0	0	0	1	1	1–3	3	9	2, 10	Yes	
Susskind	4	0	0	0	0	0	1	1	1	1	1	1–4	3	9	2, 10	Yes	
Susskind	3	0	0	1	1	1	1	1	1	0	0	1–4	3	9	2, 10	Yes	
Susskind	2	0	1	1	1	0	0	1	1	1	0	1–4	3	9	2, 10	Yes	
Susskind	1	1	1	1	0	0	0	0	1	1	1	1–4	3	9	2, 10	Yes	
Klar	4	0	0	0	0	0	1	1	1	1	1	0–4	4 (3)	9	2, 10	Yes	
Klar	3	0	0	0	1	1	1	1	0	0	0	0–4	4 (3)	9	2, 10	Yes	
Klar	2	0	0	1	1	1	1	1	1	0	0	0–4	4 (3)	9	2, 10	Yes	
Klar	1	0	1	1	1	0	0	1	1	1	0	0–4	4 (3)	9	2, 10	Yes	
Tompkins II	4	0	0	0	0	0	1	1	1	1	1	1–3	2	9 (Note: For Tompkins code II, a 9s complement can be derived by inverting the first three digits and swapping the two middle binary digits.)	2, 10	Yes	
Tompkins II	3	0	0	1	1	1	1	1	0	0	0	1–3	2	9	2, 10	Yes	
Tompkins II	2	1	1	1	0	0	0	0	0	1	1	1–3	2	9	2, 10	Yes	
Tompkins II	1	0	1	1	1	0	0	1	1	1	0	1–3	2	9	2, 10	Yes	
Excess-3 Gray	4	0	0	0	0	0	1	1	1	1	1	1–4	4	9	2, 10	Yes	
Excess-3 Gray	3	0	1	1	1	1	1	1	1	1	0	1–4	4	9	2, 10	Yes	
Excess-3 Gray	2	1	1	1	0	0	0	0	1	1	1	1–4	4	9	2, 10	Yes	
Excess-3 Gray	1	0	0	1	1	0	0	1	1	0	0	1–4	4	9	2, 10	Yes	

== See also ==
- De Bruijn sequence
- Hamming code
- Hilbert curve
- Linear-feedback shift register
- Minimum distance code
- Prouhet–Thue–Morse sequence – related to inverse Gray code
- Ryser formula
- Steinhaus–Johnson–Trotter algorithm – an algorithm that generates Gray codes for the factorial number system
