= Excess-3 =

Variation to BCD-code where three (11) is added to a binary representation

Stibitz code
- Digits: 4
- Tracks: 4
- Digit values: 8 4 −2̅ −1̅
- Weight(s): 1..3
- Continuity: No
- Cyclic: No
- Minimum distance: 1
- Maximum distance: 4
- Redundancy: 0.7
- Lexicography: 1
- Complement: 9

Excess-3, 3-excess or 10-excess-3 binary code (often abbreviated as XS-3, 3XS or X3), shifted binary or Stibitz code (after George Stibitz, who built a relay-based adding machine in 1937) is a self-complementary binary-coded decimal (BCD) code and numeral system. It is a biased representation. Excess-3 code was used on some older computers as well as in cash registers and hand-held portable electronic calculators of the 1970s, among other uses.

== Representation ==
Biased codes are a way to represent values with a balanced number of positive and negative numbers using a pre-specified number N as a biasing value. Biased codes (and Gray codes) are non-weighted codes. In excess-3 code, numbers are represented as decimal digits, and each digit is represented by four bits as the digit value plus 3 (the "excess" amount):

- The smallest binary number represents the smallest value (0 − excess).
- The greatest binary number represents the largest value (2^{N+1} − excess − 1).

Excess-3, and Stibitz code
| Decimal | Excess-3 | Stibitz | BCD 8-4-2-1 | Binary | 3-of-6 CCITT extension | 4-of-8 Hamming extension |
|---|---|---|---|---|---|---|
| 0 | 0011 | 0011 | 0000 | 0000 | ...10 | ...0011 |
| 1 | 0100 | 0100 | 0001 | 0001 | ...11 | ...1011 |
| 2 | 0101 | 0101 | 0010 | 0010 | ...10 | ...0101 |
| 3 | 0110 | 0110 | 0011 | 0011 | ...10 | ...0110 |
| 4 | 0111 | 0111 | 0100 | 0100 | ...00 | ...1000 |
| 5 | 1000 | 1000 | 0101 | 0101 | ...11 | ...0111 |
| 6 | 1001 | 1001 | 0110 | 0110 | ...10 | ...1001 |
| 7 | 1010 | 1010 | 0111 | 0111 | ...10 | ...1010 |
| 8 | 1011 | 1011 | 1000 | 1000 | ...00 | ...0100 |
| 9 | 1100 | 1100 | 1001 | 1001 | ...10 | ...1100 |

To encode a number such as 127, one simply encodes each of the decimal digits as above, giving (0100, 0101, 1010).

Excess-3 arithmetic uses different algorithms than normal non-biased BCD or binary positional system numbers. After adding two excess-3 digits, the raw sum is excess-6. For instance, after adding 1 (0100 in excess-3) and 2 (0101 in excess-3), the sum looks like 6 (1001 in excess-3) instead of 3 (0110 in excess-3). To correct this problem, after adding two digits, it is necessary to remove the extra bias by subtracting binary 0011 (decimal 3 in unbiased binary) if the resulting digit is less than decimal 10, or subtracting binary 1101 (decimal 13 in unbiased binary) if an overflow (carry) has occurred. (In 4-bit binary, subtracting binary 1101 is equivalent to adding 0011 and vice versa.)

== Advantage ==
The primary advantage of excess-3 coding over non-biased coding is that a decimal number can be nines' complemented (for subtraction) as easily as a binary number can be ones' complemented: just by inverting all bits. Also, when the sum of two excess-3 digits is greater than 9, the carry bit of a 4-bit adder will be set high. This works because, after adding two digits, an "excess" value of 6 results in the sum. Because a 4-bit integer can only hold values 0 to 15, an excess of 6 means that any sum over 9 will overflow (produce a carry-out).

Another advantage is that the codes 0000 and 1111 are not used for any digit. A fault in a memory or basic transmission line may result in these codes. It is also more difficult to write the zero pattern to magnetic media.

== Example ==
BCD 8-4-2-1 to excess-3 converter example in VHDL:

entity bcd8421xs3 is
  port (
    a   : in    std_logic;
    b   : in    std_logic;
    c   : in    std_logic;
    d   : in    std_logic;

    an  : buffer std_logic;
    bn  : buffer std_logic;
    cn  : buffer std_logic;
    dn  : buffer std_logic;

    w   : out   std_logic;
    x   : out   std_logic;
    y   : out   std_logic;
    z   : out   std_logic
  );
end entity bcd8421xs3;

architecture dataflow of bcd8421xs3 is
begin
    an  <=  not a;
    bn  <=  not b;
    cn  <=  not c;
    dn  <=  not d;

    w   <=  (an and b  and d ) or (a  and bn and cn)
         or (an and b  and c  and dn);
    x   <=  (an and bn and d ) or (an and bn and c  and dn)
         or (an and b  and cn and dn) or (a  and bn and cn and d);
    y   <=  (an and cn and dn) or (an and c  and d )
         or (a  and bn and cn and dn);
    z   <=  (an and dn) or (a  and bn and cn and dn);

end architecture dataflow; -- of bcd8421xs3

== Extensions ==
3-of-6 extension
- Digits: 6
- Tracks: 6
- Weight(s): 3
- Continuity: No
- Cyclic: No
- Minimum distance: 2
- Maximum distance: 6
- Lexicography: 1
- Complement: (9)

4-of-8 extension
- Digits: 8
- Tracks: 8
- Weight(s): 4
- Continuity: No
- Cyclic: No
- Minimum distance: 4
- Maximum distance: 8
- Lexicography: 1
- Complement: 9

- 3-of-6 code extension: The excess-3 code is sometimes also used for data transfer, then often expanded to a 6-bit code per CCITT GT 43 No. 1, where 3 out of 6 bits are set.
- 4-of-8 code extension: As an alternative to the IBM transceiver code (which is a 4-of-8 code with a Hamming distance of 2), it is also possible to define a 4-of-8 excess-3 code extension achieving a Hamming distance of 4, if only denary digits are to be transferred.

== See also ==
- Offset binary, excess-N, biased representation
- Excess-128
- Excess-Gray code
- Shifted Gray code
- Gray code
- m-of-n code
- Aiken code
