= Midy's theorem =

On decimal expansions of fractions with prime denominator and even repeat period

In mathematics, Midy's theorem, named after French mathematician E. Midy, is a statement about the decimal expansion of fractions a/p where p is a prime and a/p has a repeating decimal expansion with an even period (sequence A028416 in the OEIS). If the period of the decimal representation of a/p is 2n, so that

$$\frac{a}{p}=0.\overline{a_1a_2a_3\dots a_na_{n+1}\dots a_{2n}}$$

then the digits in the second half of the repeating decimal period are the 9s complement of the corresponding digits in its first half. In other words,

$$a_i+a_{i+n}=9$$
$$a_1\dots a_n+a_{n+1}\dots a_{2n}=10^n-1.$$

For example,

$$\frac{1}{7}=0.\overline{142857}\text{ and }142+857=999.$$
$$\frac{1}{13}=0.\overline{076923}\text{ and }076+923=999.$$
$$\frac{1}{17}=0.\overline{0588235294117647}\text{ and }05882352+94117647=99999999.$$

== Extended Midy's theorem ==
If k is any divisor of h (where h is the number of digits of the period of the decimal expansion of a/p (where p is again a prime)), then Midy's theorem can be generalised as follows. The extended Midy's theorem states that if the repeating portion of the decimal expansion of a/p is divided into k-digit numbers, then their sum is a multiple of 10^{k} − 1.

For example,
$$\frac{1}{19}=0.\overline{052631578947368421}$$
has a period of 18. Dividing the repeating portion into 6-digit numbers and summing them gives
$$052631+578947+368421=999999.$$
Similarly, dividing the repeating portion into 3-digit numbers and summing them gives
$$052+631+578+947+368+421=2997=3\times999.$$

== Midy's theorem in other bases ==
Midy's theorem and its extension do not depend on special properties of the decimal expansion, but work equally well in any base b, provided we replace 10^{k} − 1 with b^{k} − 1 and carry out addition in base b.

For example, in octal

$$\begin{align}
& \frac{1}{19}=0.\overline{032745}_8 \\[8pt]
& 032_8+745_8=777_8 \\[8pt]
& 03_8+27_8+45_8=77_8.
\end{align}$$

In dozenal (using inverted two and three for ten and eleven, respectively)

$$\begin{align}
& \frac{1}{19}=0.\overline{076\mathcal{E}45}_{12} \\[8pt]
& 076_{12}+\mathcal{E}45_{12}=\mathcal{EEE}_{12} \\[8pt]
& 07_{12}+6\mathcal{E}_{12}+45_{12}=\mathcal{EE}_{12}
\end{align}$$

== Proof of Midy's theorem ==
Short proofs of Midy's theorem can be given using results from group theory. However, it is also possible to prove Midy's theorem using elementary algebra and modular arithmetic:

Let p be a prime and a/p be a fraction between 0 and 1. Suppose the expansion of a/p in base b has a period of ℓ, so

$$\begin{align}
& \frac{a}{p} = [0.\overline{a_1a_2\dots a_\ell}]_b \\[6pt]
& \Rightarrow\frac{a}{p}b^\ell = [a_1a_2\dots a_\ell.\overline{a_1a_2\dots a_\ell}]_b \\[6pt]
& \Rightarrow\frac{a}{p}b^\ell = N+[0.\overline{a_1a_2\dots a_\ell}]_b=N+\frac{a}{p} \\[6pt]
& \Rightarrow\frac{a}{p} = \frac{N}{b^\ell-1}
\end{align}$$

where N is the integer whose expansion in base b is the string a_{1}a_{2}...a_{ℓ}.

Note that b^{ℓ} − 1 is a multiple of p because (b^{ℓ} − 1)a/p is an integer. Also b^{n}−1 is not a multiple of p for any value of n less than ℓ, because otherwise the repeating period of a/p in base b would be less than ℓ.

Now suppose that ℓ = hk. Then b^{ℓ} − 1 is a multiple of b^{k} − 1. (To see this, substitute x for b^{k}; then b^{ℓ} = x^{h} and x − 1 is a factor of x^{h} − 1. ) Say b^{ℓ} − 1 = m(b^{k} − 1), so

$$\frac{a}{p}=\frac{N}{m(b^k-1)}.$$

But b^{ℓ} − 1 is a multiple of p; b^{k} − 1 is not a multiple of p (because k is less than ℓ ); and p is a prime; so m must be a multiple of p and

$$\frac{am}{p}=\frac{N}{b^k-1}$$

is an integer. In other words,

$$N\equiv0\pmod{b^k-1}.$$

Now split the string a_{1}a_{2}...a_{ℓ} into h equal parts of length k, and let these represent the integers N_{0}...N_{h − 1} in base b, so that

$$\begin{align}
N_{h-1} & = [a_1\dots a_k]_b \\
N_{h-2} & = [a_{k+1}\dots a_{2k}]_b \\
& {}\  \   \vdots \\
N_0 & = [a_{l-k+1}\dots a_l]_b
\end{align}$$

To prove Midy's extended theorem in base b we must show that the sum of the h integers N_{i} is a multiple of b^{k} − 1.

Since b^{k} is congruent to 1 modulo b^{k} − 1, any power of b^{k} will also be congruent to 1 modulo b^{k} − 1. So

$$N=\sum_{i=0}^{h-1}N_ib^{ik}=\sum_{i=0}^{h-1}N_i(b^{k})^i$$
$$\Rightarrow N \equiv \sum_{i=0}^{h-1}N_i \pmod{b^k-1}$$
$$\Rightarrow \sum_{i=0}^{h-1}N_i \equiv 0 \pmod{b^k-1}$$

which proves Midy's extended theorem in base b.

To prove the original Midy's theorem, take the special case where h = 2. Note that N_{0} and N_{1} are both represented by strings of k digits in base b so both satisfy

$$0 \leq N_i \leq b^k-1.$$

N_{0} and N_{1} cannot both equal 0 (otherwise a/p = 0) and cannot both equal b^{k} − 1 (otherwise a/p = 1), so

$$0 < N_0+N_1 < 2(b^k-1)$$

and since N_{0} + N_{1} is a multiple of b^{k} − 1, it follows that

$$N_0+N_1 = b^k-1.$$

== Corollary ==
From the above,
$$\frac{am}{p}$$
is an integer

Thus $m \equiv 0 \pmod p$

And thus for $k = \frac{\ell}{2}$

$$b^{\ell/2}+ 1 \equiv 0 \pmod p$$

For $k = \frac{\ell}{3}$ and is an integer

$$b^{2\ell/3} + b^{\ell/3} + 1 \equiv 0 \pmod p$$

and so on.
