= Signed overpunch =

Data encoding technique

In computing, a signed overpunch is a coding scheme which stores the sign of a number by changing (usually) the last digit. It is used in character data on IBM mainframes by languages such as COBOL, PL/I, and RPG. Its purpose is to save a character that would otherwise be used by the sign digit. The code is derived from the Hollerith Punched Card Code, where both a digit and a sign can be entered in the same card column. It is called an overpunch because the digit in that column has a 12-punch or an 11-punch above it to indicate the sign. The top three rows of the card are called zone punches, and so numeric character data which may contain overpunches is called zoned decimal.

In IBM terminology, the low-order four bits of a byte in storage are called the digit, and the high-order four bits are the zone. The digit bits contain the numeric value 0–9. The zone bits contain either 'F'x, forming the characters 0–9, or the character position containing the overpunch contains a hexadecimal value indicating a positive or negative value, forming a different set of characters. (A, C, E, and F zones indicate positive values, B and D negative).

The PACK instruction on IBM System/360 architecture machines converts the sign of a zoned decimal number when converting to packed decimal, and the corresponding UNPK instruction will set the correct overpunched sign of its zoned decimal output.

== Language support ==
=== PL/I ===
PL/I uses the PICTURE attribute to declare zoned decimal data with a signed overpunch. Each character in a numeric picture except V, which indicates the position of the assumed decimal point, represents a digit. A picture character of T, I, or R indicates a digit position which may contain an overpunch. T indicates that the position will contain {–I if positive and {–R if negative. I indicates that the position will contain {–I if positive and 0-9 if negative. R indicates that the position will contain 0–9 if positive and {–R if negative.

For example PICTURE 'Z99R' describes a four-character numeric field. The first position may be blank or will contain a digit 0–9. The next two positions will contain digits, and the fourth position will contain 0–9 for a positive number and {–R for negative.

Assigning the value 1021 to the above picture will store the characters "1021" in memory; assigning -1021 will store "102J".

=== COBOL ===
COBOL uses the picture character 'S' for USAGE IS DISPLAY data without SIGN IS SEPARATE CHARACTER to indicate an overpunch. SIGN IS LEADING indicates that the overpunch is over the first character of the field. SIGN IS TRAILING, locates it over the last character. SIGN IS TRAILING is the default.

=== C/C++ ===
The C language has no provision for zoned decimal. The IBM ILE C/C++ compiler for System i provides functions for conversion between int or double and zoned decimal:

- QXXDTOZ() — Convert Double to Zoned Decimal
- QXXITOZ() — Convert Integer to Zoned Decimal
- QXXZTOD() — Convert Zoned Decimal to Double
- QXXZTOI() — Convert Zoned Decimal to Integer

== EBCDIC overpunch codes ==
EBCDIC character	Digit	Sign	Card code
{	0	+	12–0
A	1	+	12–1
B	2	+	12–2
C	3	+	12–3
D	4	+	12–4
E	5	+	12–5
F	6	+	12–6
G	7	+	12–7
H	8	+	12–8
I	9	+	12–9
}	0	-	11–0
J	1	-	11–1
K	2	-	11–2
L	3	-	11–3
M	4	-	11–4
N	5	-	11–5
O	6	-	11–6
P	7	-	11–7
Q	8	-	11–8
R	9	-	11–9

== Examples ==
10} is -100
45A is 451

== ASCII representation ==
Representation of signed overpunch characters "is not standardized in ASCII, and different compilers use different overpunch codes." In some cases, "the representation is not the same as the result of converting an EBCDIC Signed field to ASCII with a translation table." In other cases they are the same, to maintain source-data compatibility at the loss of the connection between the character code and the corresponding digit.

An EBCDIC negative field ending with the digit '1' will encode that digit as 'D1'x, upper-case 'J', where the digit is '1' and the zone is 'D' to indicate a negative field. ASCII upper-case 'J' is '4A'x, where the hexadecimal value bears no relationship to the numeric value. An alternative encoding uses lower-case 'q', '71'x, for this representation, where the digit is '1' and the zone is '7'. This preserves the digit and the collating sequence at the cost of having to recognize and translate fields with overpunches individually.

=== Examples ===
Gnu COBOL and MicroFocus COBOL use lower-case 'p' thru 'y' to represent negative '0' thru '9'.

PL/I compilers on ASCII systems use the same set of characters ({, J–R) as EBCDIC to represent negative values.
