= Method of complements =

Method of subtraction

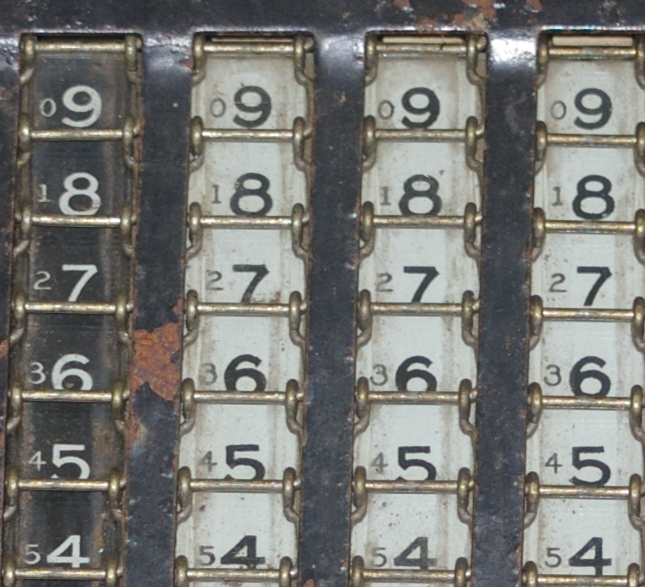
Complement numbers on an adding machine c. 1910. The smaller numbers, for use when subtracting, are the nines' complement of the larger numbers, which are used when adding.

In mathematics and computing, the method of complements is a technique to encode a symmetric range of positive and negative integers in a way that they can use the same algorithm (or mechanism) for addition throughout the whole range. For a given number of places half of the possible representations of numbers encode the positive numbers, the other half represents their respective additive inverses. The pairs of mutually additive inverse numbers are called complements. Thus subtraction of any number is implemented by adding its complement. Changing the sign of any number is encoded by generating its complement, which can be done by a very simple and efficient algorithm. This method was commonly used in mechanical calculators and is still used in modern computers. The generalized concept of the radix complement (as described below) is also valuable in number theory, such as in Midy's theorem.

The nines' complement of a number given in decimal representation is formed by replacing each digit with nine minus that digit. To subtract a decimal number y (the subtrahend) from another number x (the minuend) two methods may be used:

In the first method, the nines' complement of x is added to y. Then the nines' complement of the result obtained is formed to produce the desired result.

In the second method, the nines' complement of y is added to x and one is added to the sum. The leftmost digit '1' of the result is then discarded. Discarding the leftmost '1' is especially convenient on calculators or computers that use a fixed number of digits: there is nowhere for it to go so it is simply lost during the calculation. The nines' complement plus one is known as the tens' complement.

The method of complements can be extended to other number bases (radices); in particular, it is used on most digital computers to perform subtraction, represent negative numbers in base 2 or binary arithmetic and test overflow in calculation.

== Numeric complements ==
The radix complement of an $n$-digit number $y$ in radix $b$ is defined as $b^n - y$. In practice, the radix complement is more easily obtained by adding 1 to the diminished radix complement, which is $\left(b^n - 1\right) - y$. While this seems equally difficult to calculate as the radix complement, it is actually simpler since $\left(b^n - 1\right)$ is simply the digit $b - 1$ repeated $n$ times in base two. This is because

$$\begin{align}
b^n - 1 &= (b - 1)(b^{n-1} + b^{n-2} + \cdots + b + 1) \\
&= (b - 1)b^{n-1} + \cdots + (b - 1)
\end{align}$$

(see also Geometric series Formula). Knowing this, the diminished radix complement of a number can be found by complementing each digit with respect to $b - 1$, i.e. subtracting each digit in $y$ from $b - 1$.

The subtraction of $y$ from $x$ using diminished radix complements may be performed as follows. Add the diminished radix complement of $x$ to $y$ to obtain $b^n - 1 - x + y$ or equivalently $b^n - 1 - (x - y)$, which is the diminished radix complement of $x-y$. Further taking the diminished radix complement of $b^n - 1 - (x - y)$ results in the desired answer of $x - y$.

Alternatively using the radix complement, $x-y$ may be obtained by adding the radix complement of $y$ to $x$ to obtain $x + b^n - y$ or $x - y + b^n$. Assuming $y \leq x$ , the result will be greater or equal to $b^n$ and dropping the leading $1$ from the result is the same as subtracting $b^n$, making the result $x - y + b^n - b^n$ or just $x - y$, the desired result.

In the decimal numbering system, the radix complement is called the ten's complement and the diminished radix complement the nines' complement. In binary, the radix complement is called the two's complement and the diminished radix complement the ones' complement. The naming of complements in other bases is similar. Some people, notably Donald Knuth, recommend using the placement of the apostrophe to distinguish between the radix complement and the diminished radix complement. In this usage, the four's complement refers to the radix complement of a number in base four while fours' complement is the diminished radix complement of a number in base 5. However, the distinction is not important when the radix is apparent (nearly always), and the subtle difference in apostrophe placement is not common practice. Most writers use one's and nine's complement, and many style manuals leave out the apostrophe, recommending ones and nines complement.

== Decimal example ==
Digit	Nines' complement
0	9
1	8
2	7
3	6
4	5
5	4
6	3
7	2
8	1
9	0

The nines' complement of a decimal digit is the number that must be added to it to produce 9; the nines' complement of 3 is 6, the nines' complement of 7 is 2, and so on, see table. To form the nines' complement of a larger number, each digit is replaced by its nines' complement.

Consider the following subtraction problem:

  873  [x, the minuend]
- 218  [y, the subtrahend]

=== First method ===
1. Compute the nines' complement of the minuend (873).

 999 - 873 = 126

2. Add that to the subtrahend (218).

  126  [nines' complement of x = 999 - x]
+ 218  [y, the subtrahend]
—————
  344  [999 - x + y]

3. Now calculate the nines' complement of the result

  344  [result]
  655  [nines' complement of 344 = 999 - (999 - x + y) = x - y, the correct answer]

=== Second method ===
1. Compute the nines' complement of 218, which is 781. Because 218 is three digits long, this is the same as subtracting 218 from 999.

2. Next, the sum of $x$ and the nines' complement of $y$ is taken.

  873  [x]
+ 781  [nines' complement of y = 999 - y]
—————
 1654  [999 + x - y]

3. The leading "1" digit is then dropped, giving 654.

 1654
-1000  [-(999 + 1)]
—————
  654  [-(999 + 1) + 999 + x - y]

4. This is not yet correct. In the first step, 999 was added to the equation. Then 1000 was subtracted when the leading 1 was dropped. So, the answer obtained (654) is one less than the correct answer $x-y$. To fix this, 1 is added to the answer.

  654
+   1
—————
  655  [x - y]

Adding a 1 gives 655, the correct answer to our original subtraction problem. The last step of adding 1 could be skipped if instead the ten's complement of y was used in the first step.

=== Magnitude of numbers ===
In the following example the result of the subtraction has fewer digits than $x$:

  123410  [x, the minuend]
- 123401  [y, the subtrahend]

Using the first method the sum of the nines' complement of $x$ and $y$ is

  876589  [nines' complement of x]
+ 123401  [y]
————————
  999990

The nines' complement of 999990 is 000009. Removing the leading zeros gives 9, the desired result.

If the subtrahend, $y$, has fewer digits than the minuend, $x$, leading zeros must be added in the second method. These zeros become leading nines when the complement is taken. For example:

  48032  [x]
-   391  [y]

can be rewritten

  48032  [x]
- 00391  [y with leading zeros]

Replacing 00391 with its nines' complement and adding 1 produces the sum:

  48032  [x]
+ 99608  [nines' complement of y]
+     1
———————
 147641

Dropping the leading 1 gives the correct answer: 47641.

== Binary method ==
Binary digit	Ones' complement
0	1
1	0

The method of complements is especially useful in binary (radix 2) since the ones' complement is very easily obtained by inverting each bit (changing '0' to '1' and vice versa). Adding 1 to get the two's complement can be done by simulating a carry into the least significant bit. For example:

  0110 0100  [x, equals decimal 100]
- 0001 0110  [y, equals decimal 22]

becomes the sum:

  0110 0100  [x]
+ 1110 1001  [ones' complement of y = 1111 1111 - y]
+         1  [to get the two's complement = 1 0000 0000 - y]
———————————
 10100 1110  [x + 1 0000 0000 - y]

Dropping the initial "1" gives the answer: 0100 1110 (equals decimal 78)

== Negative number representations ==
The method of complements normally assumes that the operands are positive and that y ≤ x, logical constraints given that adding and subtracting arbitrary integers is normally done by comparing signs, adding the two or subtracting the smaller from the larger, and giving the result the correct sign.

Let's see what happens if x < y. In that case, there will not be a "1" digit to cross out after the addition since $x-y+b^n$ will be less than $b^n$. For example, (in decimal):

  185  [x]
- 329  [y]

Complementing y and adding gives:

  185  [x]
+ 670  [nines' complement of y]
+   1
—————
  856

At this point, there is no simple way to complete the calculation by subtracting $b^n$ (1000 in this case); one cannot simply ignore a leading 1. The expected answer is −144, which isn't as far off as it seems; 856 happens to be the ten's complement of 144. This issue can be addressed in a number of ways:

- Ignore the issue. This is reasonable if a person is operating a calculating device that doesn't support negative numbers since comparing the two operands before the calculation so they can be entered in the proper order, and verifying that the result is reasonable, is easy for humans to do.
- Use the same method to subtract 856 from 1000, and then add a negative sign to the result.
- Represent negative numbers as radix complements of their positive counterparts. Numbers less than $b^n/2$ are considered positive; the rest are considered negative (and their magnitude can be obtained by taking the radix complement). This works best for even radices since the sign can be determined by looking at the first digit. For example, numbers in ten's complement notation are positive if the first digit is 0, 1, 2, 3, or 4, and negative if 5, 6, 7, 8, or 9. And it works very well in binary since the first bit can be considered a sign bit: the number is positive if the sign bit is 0 and negative if it is 1. Indeed, two's complement is used in most modern computers to represent signed numbers.
- Complement the result if there is no carry out of the most significant digit (an indication that x was less than y). This is easier to implement with digital circuits than comparing and swapping the operands. But since taking the radix complement requires adding 1, it is difficult to do directly. Fortunately, a trick can be used to get around this addition: Instead of always setting a carry into the least significant digit when subtracting, the carry out of the most significant digit is used as the carry input into the least significant digit (an operation called an end-around carry). So if y ≤ x, the carry from the most significant digit that would normally be ignored is added, producing the correct result. And if not, the 1 is not added and the result is one less than the radix complement of the answer, or the diminished radix complement, which does not require an addition to obtain. This method is used by computers that use sign-and-magnitude to represent signed numbers.

== Practical uses ==
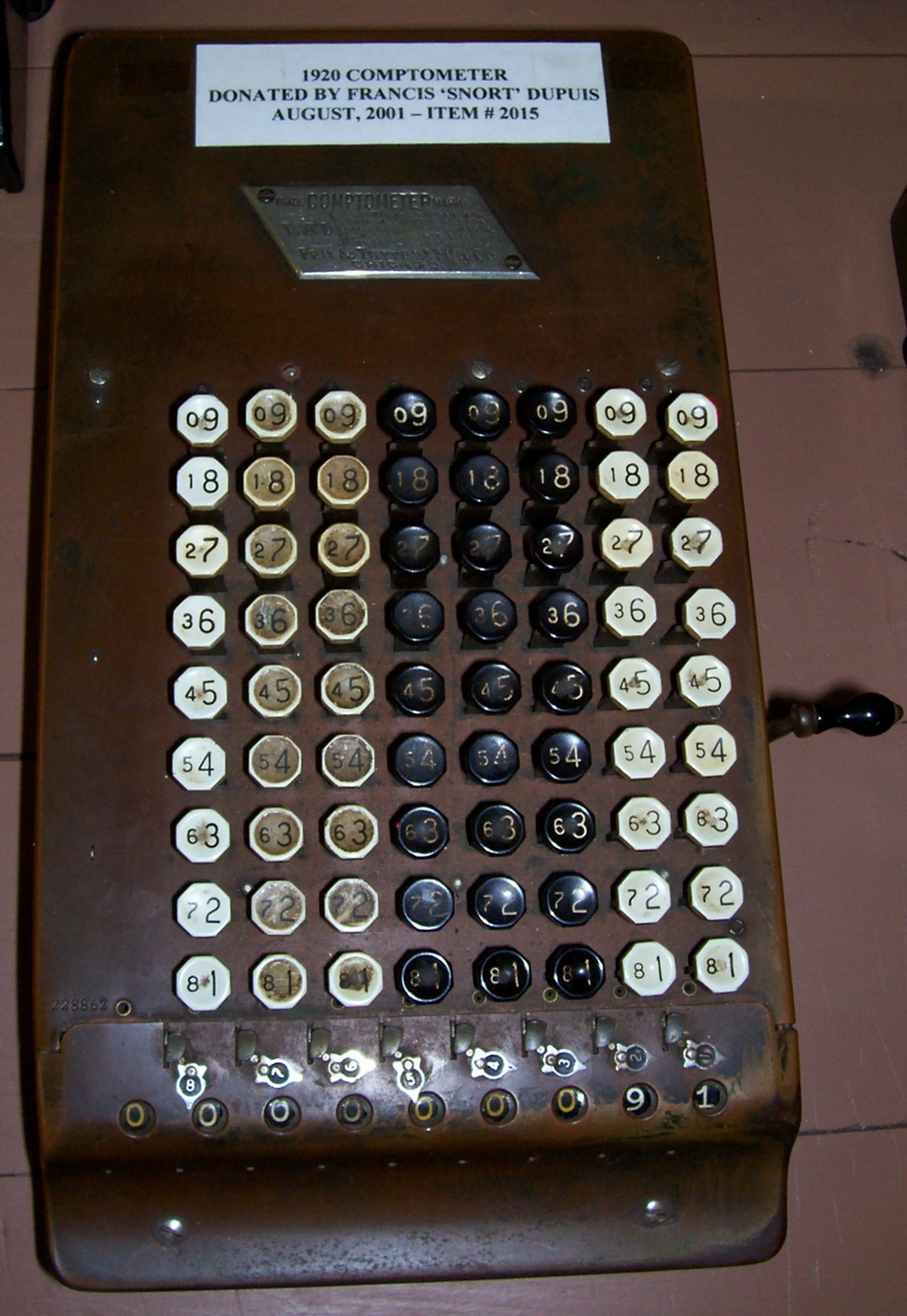
Comptometer from the 1920s, with nines' complements marked on each key

The method of complements was used in many mechanical calculators as an alternative to running the gears backwards. For example:

- Pascal's calculator had two sets of result digits, a black set displaying the normal result and a red set displaying the nines' complement of this. A horizontal slat was used to cover up one of these sets, exposing the other. To subtract, the red digits were exposed and set to 0. Then the nines' complement of the minuend was entered. On some machine this could be done by dialing in the minuend using inner wheels of complements (i.e. without having to mentally determine the nines' complement of the minuend). In displaying that data in the complement window (red set), the operator could see the nines' complement of the nines' complement of the minuend, that is the minuend. The slat was then moved to expose the black digits (which now displayed the nines' complement of the minuend) and the subtrahend was added by dialing it in. Finally, the operator had to move the slat again to read the correct answer.
- The Comptometer had nines' complement digits printed in smaller type along with the normal digits on each key. To subtract, the operator was expected to mentally subtract 1 from the subtrahend and enter the result using the smaller digits. Since subtracting 1 before complementing is equivalent to adding 1 afterwards, the operator would thus effectively add the ten's complement of the subtrahend. The operator also needed to hold down the "subtraction cutoff tab" corresponding to the leftmost digit of the answer. This tab prevented the carry from being propagated past it, the Comptometer's method of dropping the initial 1 from the result.
- The Curta calculator used the method of complements for subtraction, and managed to hide this from the user. Numbers were entered using digit input slides along the side of the device. The number on each slide was added to a result counter by a gearing mechanism which engaged cams on a rotating "echelon drum" (a.k.a. "step drum"). The drum was turned by use of a crank on the top of the instrument. The number of cams encountered by each digit as the crank turned was determined by the value of that digit. For example, if a slide is set to its "6" position, a row of 6 cams would be encountered around the drum corresponding to that position. For subtraction, the drum was shifted slightly before it was turned, which moved a different row of cams into position. This alternate row contained the nines' complement of the digits. Thus, the row of 6 cams that had been in position for addition now had a row with 3 cams. The shifted drum also engaged one extra cam which added 1 to the result (as required for the method of complements). The always present ten's complement "overflow 1" which carried out beyond the most significant digit of the results register was, in effect, discarded.

=== In computers ===
Use of the method of complements is ubiquitous in digital computers, regardless of the representation used for signed numbers. However, the circuitry required depends on the representation:

- If two's complement representation is used, subtraction requires only inverting the bits of the subtrahend and setting a carry into the rightmost bit.
- Using ones' complement representation requires inverting the bits of the subtrahend and connecting the carry out of the most significant bit to the carry in of the least significant bit (end-around carry).
- Using sign-magnitude representation requires only complementing the sign bit of the subtrahend and adding, but the addition/subtraction logic needs to compare the sign bits, complement one of the inputs if they are different, implement an end-around carry, and complement the result if there was no carry from the most significant bit.

=== Manual uses ===
The method of complements was used to correct errors when accounting books were written by hand. To remove an entry from a column of numbers, the accountant could add a new entry with the ten's complement of the number to subtract. A bar was added over the digits of this entry to denote its special status. It was then possible to add the whole column of figures to obtain the corrected result.

Complementing the sum is handy for cashiers making change for a purchase from currency in a single denomination of 1 raised to an integer power of the currency's base. For decimal currencies that would be 10, 100, 1,000, etc., e.g. a $10.00 bill.

== In grade school education ==
In grade schools, students are sometimes taught the method of complements as a shortcut useful in mental arithmetic. Subtraction is done by adding the ten's complement of the subtrahend, which is the nines' complement plus 1. The result of this addition is used when it is clear that the difference will be positive, otherwise the ten's complement of the addition's result is used with it marked as negative. The same technique works for subtracting on an adding machine.

== See also ==
- Curta
