= Arithmetic shift =

Shift operator in computer programming

A right arithmetic shift of a binary number by 1. The empty position in the most significant bit is filled with a copy of the original MSB.

A left arithmetic shift of a binary number by 1. The empty position in the least significant bit is filled with a zero.

Arithmetic shift operators in various programming languages and processors
Language or processor	Left	Right
ActionScript 3, Java, JavaScript, Python, PHP, Ruby, C, C++,D, C#, Go, Julia, Rust (signed types only), Swift (signed types only) (Note: The >> operator in C and C++ is not necessarily an arithmetic shift. Usually it is only an arithmetic shift if used with a signed integer type on its left-hand side. If it is used on an unsigned integer type instead, it will be a logical shift.)	<<	>>
Ada	Shift_Left	Shift_Right_Arithmetic
Kotlin	shl	shr
Fortran	SHIFTL	SHIFTA (Note: Fortran 2008.)
Standard ML	<<	~>>
Verilog	<<<	>>> (Note: The Verilog arithmetic right shift operator only actually performs an arithmetic shift if the first operand is signed. If the first operand is unsigned, the operator actually performs a logical right shift.)
OpenVMS macro language	@ (Note: In the OpenVMS macro language, whether an arithmetic shift is left or right is determined by whether the second operand is positive or negative. This is unusual. In most programming languages the two directions have distinct operators, with the operator specifying the direction, and the second operand is implicitly positive. (Some languages, such as Verilog, require that negative values be converted to unsigned positive values. Some languages, such as C and C++, have no defined behaviour if negative values are used.))	
Scheme	arithmetic-shift (Note: In Scheme arithmetic-shift can be both left and right shift, depending on the second operand, very similar to the OpenVMS macro language, although R6RS Scheme adds both -right and -left variants.)	
Common Lisp	ash	
OCaml	lsl	asr
Haskell	Data.Bits.shift (Note: The Bits class from Haskell's Data.Bits module defines both shift taking a signed argument and shiftL/shiftR taking unsigned arguments. These are isomorphic; for new definitions the programmer need provide only one of the two forms and the other form will be automatically defined in terms of the provided one.)	
VHDL	sla (Note: The VHDL arithmetic left shift operator is unusual. Instead of filling the LSB of the result with zero, it copies the original LSB into the new LSB. While this is an exact mirror image of the arithmetic right shift, it is not the conventional definition of the operator, and is not equivalent to multiplication by a power of 2. In the VHDL 2008 standard this strange behavior was left unchanged (for backward compatibility) for argument types that do not have forced numeric interpretation (e.g., BIT_VECTOR) but 'SLA' for unsigned and signed argument types behaves in the expected way (i.e., rightmost positions are filled with zeros). VHDL's shift left logical (SLL) function does implement the aforementioned 'standard' arithmetic shift.)	sra
Assembly: Z80	SLA	SRA
Assembly: x86	SAL	SAR
Assembly: 68k	ASL	ASR
Assembly: RISC-V	sll, slli	sra, srai

In computer programming, an arithmetic shift is a shift operator, sometimes termed a signed shift (though it is not restricted to signed operands). The two basic types are the arithmetic left shift and the arithmetic right shift. For binary numbers it is a bitwise operation that shifts all of the bits of its operand; every bit in the operand is simply moved a given number of bit positions, and the vacant bit-positions are filled in. Instead of being filled with all 0s, as in logical shift, when shifting to the right, the leftmost bit (the sign bit) in ones' complement and two's complement representations is replicated to fill in all the vacant positions (this is a kind of sign extension).

Some authors prefer the terms sticky right-shift and zero-fill right-shift for arithmetic and logical shifts respectively.

Arithmetic shifts can be useful as efficient ways to perform multiplication or division of signed integers by powers of two. Shifting left by n bits on a signed or unsigned binary number has the effect of multiplying it by 2^{n}. Shifting right by n bits on a two's complement signed binary number has the effect of dividing it by 2^{n}, but it always rounds down (towards negative infinity). This is different from the way rounding is usually done in signed integer division (which rounds towards 0). This discrepancy has led to bugs in a number of compilers.

For example, in the x86 instruction set, the SAR instruction (arithmetic right shift) divides a signed number by a power of two, rounding towards negative infinity. However, the IDIV instruction (signed divide) divides a signed number, rounding towards zero. So a SAR instruction cannot be substituted for an IDIV by power of two instruction nor vice versa.

== Formal definition ==
The formal definition of an arithmetic shift, from Federal Standard 1037C is that it is:

A shift, applied to the representation of a number in a fixed radix numeration system and in a fixed-point representation system, and in which only the characters representing the fixed-point part of the number are moved. An arithmetic shift is usually equivalent to multiplying the number by a positive or a negative integral power of the radix, except for the effect of any rounding; compare the logical shift with the arithmetic shift, especially in the case of floating-point representation.

An important word in the FS 1073C definition is "usually".

=== Non-equivalence of arithmetic right shift and division ===
However, arithmetic right shifts are major traps for the unwary, specifically in treating rounding of negative integers. For example, in the usual two's complement representation of negative integers, −1 is represented as all 1's. For an 8-bit signed integer this is 1111 1111. An arithmetic right-shift by 1 (or 2, 3, ..., 7) yields 1111 1111 again, which is still −1. This corresponds to rounding down (towards negative infinity), but is not the usual convention for division.

It is frequently stated that arithmetic right shifts are equivalent to division by a (positive, integral) power of the radix (e.g., a division by a power of 2 for binary numbers), and hence that division by a power of the radix can be optimized by implementing it as an arithmetic right shift. (A shifter is much simpler than a divider. On most processors, shift instructions will execute faster than division instructions.) Large number of 1960s and 1970s programming handbooks, manuals, and other specifications from companies and institutions such as DEC, IBM, Data General, and ANSI make such incorrect statements.

Logical right shifts are equivalent to division by a power of the radix (usually 2) only for positive or unsigned numbers. Arithmetic right shifts are equivalent to logical right shifts for positive signed numbers. Arithmetic right shifts for negative numbers in N's complement (usually two's complement) is roughly equivalent to division by a power of the radix (usually 2), where for odd numbers rounding downwards is applied (not towards 0 as usually expected).

Arithmetic right shifts for negative numbers are equivalent to division using rounding towards 0 in ones' complement representation of signed numbers as was used by some historic computers, but this is no longer in general use.

==== Handling the issue in programming languages ====
The (1999) ISO standard for the programming language C defines the right shift operator in terms of divisions by powers of 2. Because of the above-stated non-equivalence, the standard explicitly excludes from that definition the right shifts of signed numbers that have negative values. It does not specify the behaviour of the right shift operator in such circumstances, but instead requires each individual C compiler to define the behaviour of shifting negative values right. (Note: The C standard was intended to not restrict the C language to either ones' complement or two's complement architectures. In cases where the behaviours of ones' complement and two's complement representations differ, such as this, the standard requires individual C compilers to document the behaviour of their target architectures. The documentation for GNU Compiler Collection (GCC), for example, documents its behaviour as employing sign-extension.)

Like C, C++ had an implementation-defined right shift for signed integers until C++20. Starting in the C++20 standard, right shift of a signed integer is defined to be an arithmetic shift.

== Applications ==
In applications where consistent rounding down is desired, arithmetic right shifts for signed values are useful. An example is in downscaling raster coordinates by a power of two, which maintains even spacing. For example, right shift by 1 sends 0, 1, 2, 3, 4, 5, ... to 0, 0, 1, 1, 2, 2, ..., and −1, −2, −3, −4, ... to −1, −1, −2, −2, ..., maintaining even spacing as −2, −2, −1, −1, 0, 0, 1, 1, 2, 2, ... In contrast, integer division with rounding towards zero sends −1, 0, and 1 all to 0 (3 points instead of 2), yielding −2, −1, −1, 0, 0, 0, 1, 1, 2, 2, ... instead, which is irregular at 0.

== See also ==
- Bitwise operation
- Logical shift
