= MIC-1 =

Processor design by Andrew S. Tanenbaum

The MIC-1 is a CPU architecture invented by Andrew S. Tanenbaum to use as a simple but complete example in his teaching book Structured Computer Organization.

It consists of a very simple control unit that runs microcode from a 512-words store.

The Micro-Assembly Language (MAL) is engineered to allow simple writing of an IJVM interpreter, and the source code for such an interpreter can be found in the book.

== Hardware ==
=== Data path ===
The data path is the core of the MIC-1. It contains 32-bit registers, buses, an ALU and a shifter.

==== Buses ====
There are 2 main buses of 32 lines (or 32 bits) each:

- B bus: connected to the output of the registers and to the input of the ALU.
- C bus: connected to the output of the shifter and to the input of the registers.

==== Registers ====
Registers are selected by 2 control lines: one to enable the B bus and the other to enable the C bus. The B bus can be enabled by just one register at a time, since the transfer of data from 2 registers at the same time, would make this data inconsistent. In contrast, the C bus can be enabled by more than 1 register at the same time; as a matter of fact, the current value present in the C bus can be written to more than 1 register without problems.

The reading and writing operations are carried out in 1 clock cycle.

The MBR register is a readonly register, and it contains 2 control lines. Since it is an 8-bit register, its output is connected to the least significant 8 bits of the B bus. It can be set to provide its output in 2 ways:

- 2's complement (MBR): all the remaining 24 bits of the B bus are set to 1, if it's a negative number, or they are set to 0, if it's a positive number (sign extension).
- Without complement (MBRU): the remaining 24 bits (of 32 total) are set to 0.

==== ALU ====
The ALU (or arithmetic logic unit) has the following input, output and control lines:

- 2 32-bit input lines: one for the B bus and one for the bus that is connected directly to the H register.
- 1 32-bit output line, which is connected directly to the shifter.
- 6 control lines aimed to select which operation to perform.
- 2 other output lines for the status flags N (negative) and Z (zero).

==== Shifter ====
The shifter contains a 32-bit input and output. The output is connected directly to the C bus. The shifter is used to perform logical and arithmetic shift operations, by simply setting respectively the control signal SLL8 (Shift Left Logical) and SRA1 (Shift Right Arithmetic).
