= Integer (computer science) =

Datum of integral data type

In computer science, an integer is a datum of integral data type, a data type that represents some range of mathematical integers. Integral data types may be of different sizes and may or may not be allowed to contain negative values. Integers are commonly represented in a computer as a group of binary digits (bits). The size of the grouping varies so the set of integer sizes available varies between different types of computers. Computer hardware nearly always provides a way to represent a processor register or memory address as an integer.

== Value and representation ==
The value of an item with an integral type is the mathematical integer that it corresponds to. Integral types may be unsigned (capable of representing only non-negative integers) or signed (capable of representing negative integers as well).

An integer value is typically specified in the source code of a program as a sequence of digits optionally prefixed with + or −. Some programming languages allow other notations, such as hexadecimal (base 16) or octal (base 8). Some programming languages also permit digit group separators.

The internal representation of this datum is the way the value is stored in the computer's memory. Unlike mathematical integers, a typical datum in a computer has some minimal and maximum possible value.

The most common representation of a positive integer is a string of bits, using the binary numeral system. The order of the memory bytes storing the bits varies; see endianness. The width, precision, or bitness of an integral type is the number of bits in its representation. An integral type with n bits can encode 2^{n} numbers; for example an unsigned type typically represents the non-negative values 0 through 2^{n} − 1. Other encodings of integer values to bit patterns are sometimes used, for example binary-coded decimal or Gray code, or as printed character codes such as ASCII.

There are four well-known ways to represent signed numbers in a binary computing system. The most common is two's complement, which allows a signed integral type with n bits to represent numbers from −2^{(n−1)} through 2^{(n−1)} − 1. Two's complement arithmetic is convenient because there is a perfect one-to-one correspondence between representations and values (in particular, no separate +0 and −0), and because addition, subtraction and multiplication do not need to distinguish between signed and unsigned types. Other possibilities include offset binary, sign-magnitude, and ones' complement.

Some computer languages define integer sizes in a machine-independent way; others have varying definitions depending on the underlying processor word size. Not all language implementations define variables of all integer sizes, and defined sizes may not even be distinct in a particular implementation. An integer in one programming language may be a different size in a different language, on a different processor, or in an execution context of different bitness; see § Words.

Some older computer architectures used decimal representations of integers, stored in binary-coded decimal (BCD) or other format. These values generally require data sizes of four bits per decimal digit (sometimes called a nibble), usually with additional bits for a sign. Many modern CPUs provide limited support for decimal integers as an extended datatype, providing instructions for converting such values to and from binary values. Depending on the architecture, decimal integers may have fixed sizes (e.g., seven decimal digits plus a sign fit into a 32-bit word), or may be variable-length (up to some maximum digit size), typically occupying two digits per byte (octet).

== Common integral data types ==
Bits	Name	Range (assuming two's complement for signed)	Decimal digits	Uses	Implementations							
Bits	Name	Range (assuming two's complement for signed)	Decimal digits	Uses	C/C++	C#	Pascal and Delphi	Java	SQL (Note: Not all SQL dialects have unsigned datatypes.)	FORTRAN	D	Rust
4	nibble, semioctet	Signed: From −8 to 7, from −(2^{3}) to 2^{3} − 1	0.9	Binary-coded decimal, single decimal digit representation	—							
4	nibble, semioctet	Unsigned: From 0 to 15, which equals 2^{4} − 1	1.2	Binary-coded decimal, single decimal digit representation	—							
8	byte, octet, i8, u8	Signed: From −128 to 127, from −(2^{7}) to 2^{7} − 1	2.11	ASCII characters, code units in the UTF-8 character encoding	int8_t, signed char (Note: The sizes of char, short, int, long and long long in C/C++ are dependent upon the implementation of the language.)	sbyte, System.SByte	Shortint	byte, java.lang.Byte	tinyint	INTEGER (Note: Fortan uses 'kinds' to control the size of integers. Parameterized constants defining the available kinds are available in the iso_fortran_env intrinsic module. Constants defining C compatible kinds are available in the iso_c_binding intrinsic module.)	byte	i8
8	byte, octet, i8, u8	Unsigned: From 0 to 255, which equals 2^{8} − 1	2.41	ASCII characters, code units in the UTF-8 character encoding	uint8_t, unsigned char	byte, System.Byte	Byte	—N/a	unsigned tinyint	—N/a	ubyte	u8
16	halfword, word, short, i16, u16	Signed: From −32,768 to 32,767, from −(2^{15}) to 2^{15} − 1	4.52	UCS-2 characters, code units in the UTF-16 character encoding	int16_t, short, int	short, System.Int16	Smallint	short, java.lang.Short	smallint	INTEGER	short	i16
16	halfword, word, short, i16, u16	Unsigned: From 0 to 65,535, which equals 2^{16} − 1	4.82	UCS-2 characters, code units in the UTF-16 character encoding	uint16_t, unsigned, unsigned int	ushort, System.UInt16	Word	char (Note: Java does not directly support arithmetic on char types. The results must be cast back into char from an int.), java.lang.Character	unsigned smallint	—N/a	ushort	u16
32	word, long, doubleword, longword, int, i32, u32	Signed: From −2,147,483,648 to 2,147,483,647, from −(2^{31}) to 2^{31} − 1	9.33	UTF-32 characters, true color with alpha, FourCC, pointers in 32-bit computing	int32_t, int, long	int, System.Int32	LongInt; Integer (Note: The sizes of Delphi's Integer and Cardinal are not guaranteed, varying from platform to platform; usually defined as LongInt and LongWord respectively.)	int, java.lang.Integer	int	INTEGER	int	i32
32	word, long, doubleword, longword, int, i32, u32	Unsigned: From 0 to 4,294,967,295, which equals 2^{32} − 1	9.63	UTF-32 characters, true color with alpha, FourCC, pointers in 32-bit computing	uint32_t, unsigned, unsigned int, unsigned long	uint, System.UInt32	LongWord; DWord; Cardinal	—N/a	unsigned int	—N/a	uint	u32
64	word, doubleword, longword, long, long long, quad, quadword, qword, int64, i64, u64	Signed: From −(2^{63}) to 2^{63} − 1	18.96	Time (e.g. milliseconds since the Unix epoch), pointers in 64-bit computing	int64_t, long, long long	long, System.Int64	Int64	long, java.lang.Long	bigint	INTEGER	long	i64
64	word, doubleword, longword, long, long long, quad, quadword, qword, int64, i64, u64	Unsigned: From 0 to 2^{64} − 1	19.27	Time (e.g. milliseconds since the Unix epoch), pointers in 64-bit computing	uint64_t, unsigned long long	ulong, System.UInt64	UInt64; QWord	—N/a	unsigned bigint	—N/a	ulong	u64
128	octaword, double quadword, i128, u128	Signed: From −(2^{127}) to 2^{127} − 1	38.23	Complex scientific calculations, IPv6 addresses, GUIDs	Only available as non-standard or compiler-specific extensions						cent (Note: Reserved for future use. Not implemented yet.)	i128
128	octaword, double quadword, i128, u128	Unsigned: From 0 to 2^{128} − 1	38.53	Complex scientific calculations, IPv6 addresses, GUIDs	Only available as non-standard or compiler-specific extensions						ucent	u128
n	n-bit integer (general case)	Signed: −(2^{n−1}) to (2^{n−1} − 1)	(n − 1) log_{10} 2		C23: _BitInt(n), signed _BitInt(n)	Ada: range -2**(n-1)..2**(n-1)-1						
n	n-bit integer (general case)	Unsigned: 0 to (2^{n} − 1)	n log_{10} 2		C23: unsigned _BitInt(n)	Ada: range 0..2**n-1, mod 2**n; standard libraries' or third-party arbitrary arithmetic libraries' BigDecimal or Decimal classes in many languages such as Python, C++, etc.						

Different CPUs support different integral data types. Typically, hardware will support both signed and unsigned types, but only a small, fixed set of widths.

The table above lists integral type widths that are supported in hardware by common processors. High-level programming languages provide more possibilities. It is common to have a 'double width' integral type that has twice as many bits as the biggest hardware-supported type. Many languages also have bit-field types (a specified number of bits, usually constrained to be less than the maximum hardware-supported width) and range types (that can represent only the integers in a specified range).

Some languages, such as Lisp, Smalltalk, REXX, Haskell, Python, and Raku, support arbitrary precision integers (also known as infinite precision integers or bignums). Other languages that do not support this concept as a top-level construct may have libraries available to represent very large numbers using arrays of smaller variables, such as Java's java.math.BigInteger class or Perl's "bigint" package. These use as much of the computer's memory as is necessary to store the numbers; however, a computer has only a finite amount of storage, so they, too, can only represent a finite subset of the mathematical integers. These schemes support very large numbers; for example one kilobyte of memory could be used to store numbers up to 2466 decimal digits long.

A Boolean type is a type that can represent only two values: 0 and 1, usually identified with false and true respectively. This type can be stored in memory using a single bit, but is often given a full byte for convenience of addressing and speed of access.

A four-bit quantity is known as a nibble (when eating, being smaller than a bite) or nybble (being a pun on the form of the word byte). One nibble corresponds to one digit in hexadecimal and holds one digit or a sign code in binary-coded decimal.

=== Bytes and octets ===
The term byte initially meant 'the smallest addressable unit of memory'. In the past, 5-, 6-, 7-, 8-, and 9-bit bytes have all been used. There have also been computers that could address individual bits ('bit-addressed machine'), or that could only address 16- or 32-bit quantities ('word-addressed machine'). The term byte was usually not used at all in connection with bit- and word-addressed machines.

The term octet always refers to an 8-bit quantity. It is mostly used in the field of computer networking, where computers with different byte widths might have to communicate.

In modern usage byte almost invariably means eight bits, since all other sizes have fallen into disuse; thus byte has come to be synonymous with octet.

=== Words ===
The term 'word' is used for a small group of bits that are handled simultaneously by processors of a particular architecture. The size of a word is thus CPU-specific. Many different word sizes have been used, including 6, 8, 12, 16, 18, 24, 32, 36, 39, 40, 48, 60, and 64 bits. Since it is architectural, the size of a word is usually set by the first CPU in a family, rather than the characteristics of a later compatible CPU. The meanings of terms derived from word, such as longword, doubleword, quadword, and halfword, also vary with the CPU and OS.

Practically all new desktop processors are capable of using 64-bit words, though embedded processors with 8- and 16-bit word size are still common. The 36-bit word length was common in the early days of computers.

One important cause of non-portability of software is the incorrect assumption that all computers have the same word size as the computer used by the programmer. For example, if a programmer using the C language incorrectly declares as int a variable that will be used to store values greater than 2^{15}−1, the program will fail on computers with 16-bit integers. That variable should have been declared as long, which has at least 32 bits on any computer. Programmers may also incorrectly assume that a pointer can be converted to an integer without loss of information, which may work on (some) 32-bit computers, but fail on 64-bit computers with 64-bit pointers and 32-bit integers. This issue is resolved by C99 in stdint.h in the form of intptr_t.

The bitness of a program may refer to the word size (or bitness) of the processor on which it runs, or it may refer to the width of a memory address or pointer, which can differ between execution modes or contexts. For example, 64-bit versions of Microsoft Windows support existing 32-bit binaries, and programs compiled for Linux's x32 ABI run in 64-bit mode yet use 32-bit memory addresses.

=== Standard integer ===
The standard integer size is platform-dependent.

In C, it is denoted by int and required to be at least 16 bits. Windows and Unix systems have 32-bit ints on both 32-bit and 64-bit architectures.

=== Short integer ===
A short integer can represent a whole number that may take less storage, while having a smaller range, compared with a standard integer on the same machine.

In C, it is denoted by short. It is required to be at least 16 bits, and is often smaller than a standard integer, but this is not required. A conforming program can assume that it can safely store values between −(2^{15} − 1) and 2^{15} − 1, but it may not assume that the range is not larger. In Java, a short is always a 16-bit integer. In the Windows API, the datatype SHORT is defined as a 16-bit signed integer on all machines.

Common short integer sizes
Programming language	Data type name	Signedness	Size in bytes	Minimum value	Maximum value
C and C++	short	signed	2	−32,767 (Note: The ISO C standard allows implementations to reserve the value with sign bit 1 and all other bits 0 (for sign–magnitude and two's complement representation) or with all bits 1 (for ones' complement) for use as a "trap" value, used to indicate (for example) an overflow.)	+32,767
C and C++	unsigned short	unsigned	2	0	65,535
C#	short	signed	2	−32,768	+32,767
C#	ushort	unsigned	2	0	65,535
Java	short	signed	2	−32,768	+32,767
SQL and Pascal	smallint	signed	2	−32,768	+32,767

=== Long integer ===
A long integer can represent an integer whose range is greater than or equal to that of a standard integer on the same machine.

In C, it is denoted by long. It is required to be at least 32 bits, and may or may not be larger than a standard integer. A conforming program can assume that it can safely store values between −(2^{31} − 1) and 2^{31} − 1, but it may not assume that the range is not larger.

Common long integer sizes
Programming language	Approval Type	Platforms	Data type name	Storage in bytes	Signed range	Unsigned range
C ISO/ANSI C99	International standard	Unix (16/32-bit systems); Windows (16/32/64-bit systems)	long	4 (minimum requirement 4)	−(2^{31} − 1) to (2^{31} − 1)	0 to (2^{32} − 1) (minimum requirement)
C ISO/ANSI C99	International standard	Unix (64-bit systems)	long	8 (minimum requirement 4)	−(2^{63} − 1) to (2^{63} − 1)	0 to (2^{64} − 1)
C++ ISO/ANSI	International standard	Unix, Windows (16/32-bit system)	long	4 (minimum requirement 4)	−(2^{31}) to (2^{31} − 1)	0 to (2^{32} − 1) (minimum requirement)
C++/CLI	International standard ECMA-372	Unix, Windows (16/32-bit systems)	long	4 (minimum requirement 4)	−(2^{31}) to (2^{31} − 1)	0 to (2^{32} − 1) (minimum requirement)
VB	Company standard	Windows	Long	4	−(2^{31}) to (2^{31} − 1)	—N/a
VBA	Company standard	Windows, Mac OS X	Long	4	−(2^{31}) to (2^{31} − 1)	—N/a
SQL Server	Company standard	Windows	BigInt	8	−(2^{63}) to (2^{63} − 1)	0 to 2^{64}
C#/ VB.NET	ECMA International standard	Microsoft .NET	long or Int64	8	−(2^{63}) to (2^{63} − 1)	0 to (2^{64} − 1)
Java	International/company standard	Java platform	long	8	−(2^{63}) to (2^{63} − 1)	—N/a
Pascal	?	Windows, UNIX	int64	8	−(2^{63}) to (2^{63} − 1)	0 to 2^{64} (Qword type)

=== Long long ===
In the C99 version of the C programming language and the C++11 version of C++, a long long type is supported that has double the minimum capacity of the standard long. This type is not supported by compilers that require C code to be compliant with the previous C++ standard, C++03, because the long long type did not exist in C++03. For an ANSI/ISO compliant compiler, the minimum requirements for the specified ranges, that is, −(2^{63} − 1) to 2^{63} − 1 for signed and 0 to 2^{64} − 1 for unsigned, must be fulfilled; however, extending this range is permitted. This can be an issue when exchanging code and data between platforms, or doing direct hardware access. Thus, there are several sets of headers providing platform independent exact width types. The C standard library provides <stdint.h>; this was introduced in C99 and C++11.

== Syntax ==
Integer literals can be written as regular Arabic numerals, consisting of a sequence of digits and with negation indicated by a minus sign before the value. However, most programming languages disallow use of commas or spaces for digit grouping. Examples of integer literals are:

- 42
- 10000
- -233000

There are several alternate methods for writing integer literals in many programming languages:

- Many programming languages, especially those influenced by C, prefix an integer literal with 0X or 0x to represent a hexadecimal value, e.g. 0xDEADBEEF. Other languages may use a different notation, e.g. some assembly languages append an H or h to the end of a hexadecimal value.
- Perl, Ruby, Java, Julia, D, Go, C#, Rust, Python (starting from version 3.6), and PHP (from version 7.4.0 onwards) allow embedded underscores for clarity, e.g. 10_000_000, and fixed-form Fortran ignores embedded spaces in integer literals. C (starting from C23) and C++ use single quotes for this purpose.
- In C and C++, a leading zero indicates an octal value, e.g. 0755. This was primarily intended to be used with Unix modes; however, it has been criticized because normal integers may also lead with zero. As such, Python, Ruby, Haskell, and OCaml prefix octal values with 0O or 0o, following the layout used by hexadecimal values.
- Several languages, including Java, C#, Scala, Python, Ruby, OCaml, C (starting from C23) and C++ can represent binary values by prefixing a number with 0B or 0b.

== Extreme values ==
In many programming languages, there exist predefined constants representing the least and the greatest values representable with a given integer type.

Names for these include

- SmallBASIC: MAXINT
- Java: java.lang.Integer.MAX_VALUE, java.lang.Integer.MIN_VALUE
  Corresponding fields exist for the other integer classes in Java.
- C: INT_MAX, INT_MIN, etc.
  - GLib: G_MININT, G_MAXINT, G_MAXUINT, ...
- C++: std::numeric_limits<int>::max(), std::numeric_limits<int>::min(), etc.
- Haskell: minBound, maxBound
- Pascal: MaxInt
- Python 2: sys.maxint
- Python 3: sys.maxsize
- Rust: i32::MAX, i32::MIN, etc.
- Turing: maxint

== See also ==
- Arbitrary-precision arithmetic
- Binary-coded decimal (BCD)
- C data types
- Integer overflow
- Signed number representations
