= Downscaling =

Procedure to infer high-resolution information from low-resolution variables

Downscaling is any procedure to infer high-resolution information from low-resolution variables. This technique is based on dynamical or statistical approaches commonly used in several disciplines, especially meteorology, climatology and remote sensing. The term downscaling usually refers to an increase in spatial resolution, but it is often also used for temporal resolution. This is not to be confused with image downscaling which is a process of reducing an image from a higher resolution to a lower resolution.

== Meteorology and climatology ==
Global Climate Models (GCMs) used for climate studies and climate projections are typically run at spatial resolutions of the order of 150 to 200 km and are limited in their ability to resolve important sub-grid scale features such as convection clouds and topography. As a result, GCM based projections may not be robust for local impact studies.

To overcome this problem, downscaling methods are developed to obtain local-scale weather and climate, particularly at the surface level, from regional-scale atmospheric variables that are provided by GCMs. Two main forms of downscaling technique exist. One form is dynamical downscaling, where output from the GCM is used to drive a regional, numerical model in higher spatial resolution, which therefore is able to simulate local conditions in greater detail. The other form is statistical downscaling, where a statistical relationship is established from observations between large scale variables, like atmospheric surface pressure, and a local variable, like the wind speed at a particular site. The relationship is then subsequently used on the GCM data to obtain the local variables from the GCM output.

Wilby and Wigley placed meteorological downscaling techniques into four categories: regression methods, weather pattern-based approaches, stochastic weather generators, which are all statistical downscaling methods, and limited-area modeling (which corresponds to dynamical downscaling methods). Among these approaches regression methods are preferred because of their relative ease of implementation and low computation requirements. Additionally, a semi-mechanistic downscaling approach can be applied as for example used for the CHELSA data of downscaled model output. In this example, the temperature algorithm is based on statistical downscaling and the precipitation algorithm incorporates orographic predictors with a subsequent bias correction.

=== Examples ===
In 2007 the U.S. Bureau of Reclamation collaborated with U.S. Department of Energy's National Energy Technology Laboratory (DOE NETL), Santa Clara University (SCU), Lawrence Livermore National Laboratory (LLNL), and University of California's Institute for Research on Climate Change and Its Societal Impacts (IRCCSI) to apply a proven technique called "Bias Correction Spatial Disaggregation" BCSD; see also "About on the Web site" to 112 contemporary global climate projections made available through the World Climate Research Program Coupled Model Intercomparison Project, Phase 3 (WCRP CMIP3). These projections represent 16 GCMs simulating climate responses to three GHG scenarios from multiple initial climate system conditions.

The effort resulted in development of 112 monthly temperature and precipitation projections over the continental U.S. at 1/8° (12 kilometres (7.5 mi)) spatial resolution during a 1950–2099 climate simulation period.

==== CORDEX ====
The Coordinated Regional Downscaling Experiment (CORDEX) was initiated in 2009 with the objective of providing a framework for the evaluation and comparison of downscaling model performance, as well as define a set of experiments to produce climate projections for use in impact and adaptation studies. CORDEX climate change experiments are driven by the World Climate Research Programme Coupled Model Intercomparison Project Phase 5 (CMIP5) GCM outputs. CORDEX defined 14 downscaling regions or domains.
