= Negative number =

Real number that is strictly less than zero

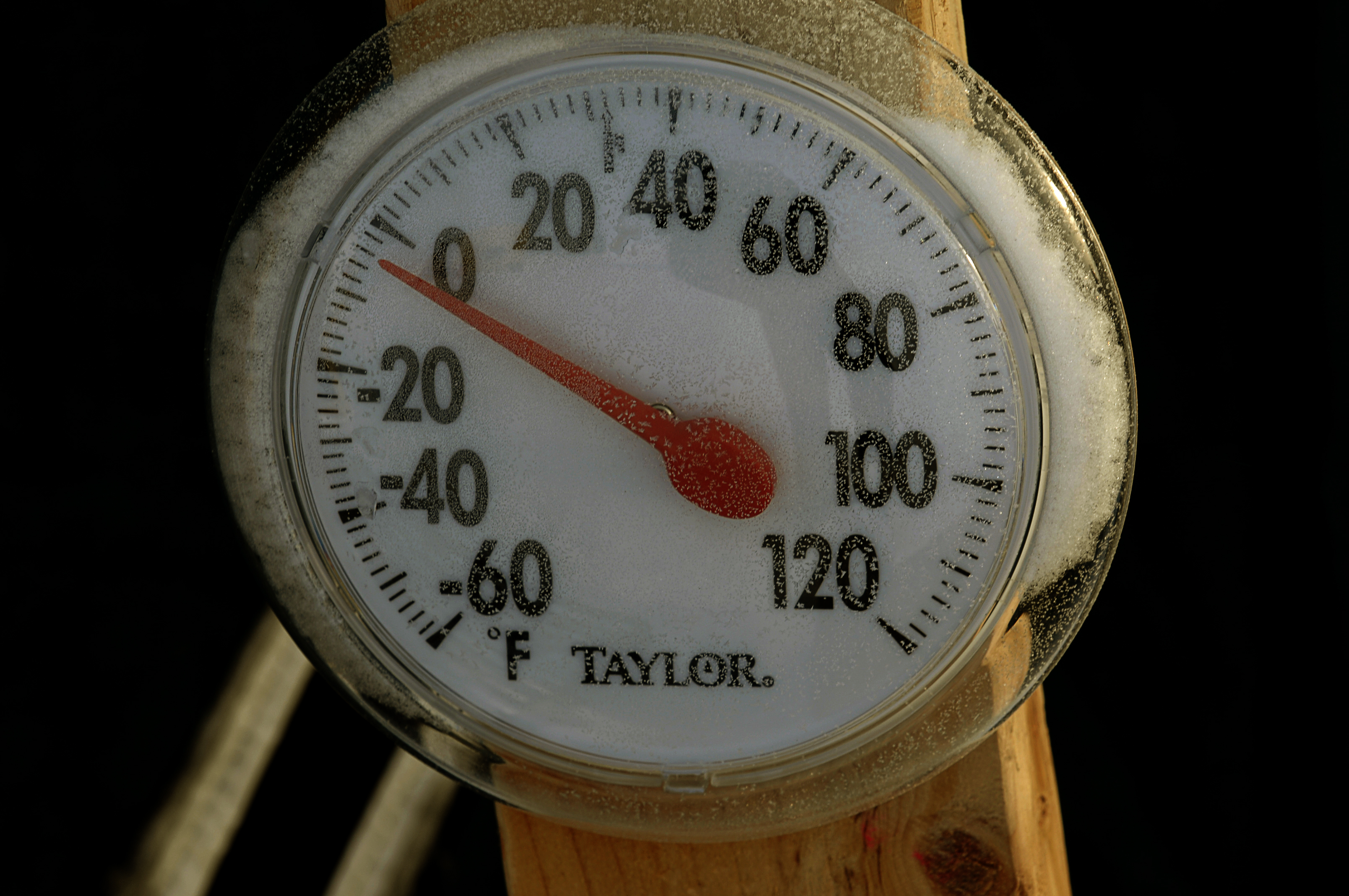
Thermometer indicating a negative Fahrenheit temperature (−4 °F).

In mathematics, a negative number is the opposite of a positive real number. Equivalently, a negative number is a real number that is less than zero. Negative numbers are often used to represent the magnitude of a loss or deficiency. A debt that is owed may be thought of as a negative asset. If a quantity, such as the charge on an electron, may have either of two opposite senses, then one may choose to distinguish between those senses—perhaps arbitrarily—as positive and negative. Negative numbers are used to describe values on a scale that goes below zero, such as the Celsius and Fahrenheit scales for temperature. The laws of arithmetic for negative numbers ensure that the common-sense idea of an opposite is reflected in arithmetic. For example, −(−3) = 3 because the opposite of an opposite is the original value.

Negative numbers are usually written with a minus sign in front. For example, −3 represents a negative quantity with a magnitude of three, and is pronounced and read as "minus three" or "negative three". Conversely, a number that is greater than zero is called positive; zero is usually (but not always) thought of as neither positive nor negative. The positivity of a number may be emphasized by placing a plus sign before it, e.g. +3. In general, the negativity or positivity of a number is referred to as its sign.

Every real number other than zero is either positive or negative. The non-negative whole numbers are referred to as natural numbers (i.e., 0, 1, 2, 3, ...), while the positive and negative whole numbers (together with zero) are referred to as integers. (Some definitions of the natural numbers exclude zero.)

In bookkeeping, amounts owed are often represented by red numbers, or a number in parentheses, as an alternative notation to represent negative numbers.

Negative numbers were used in the Nine Chapters on the Mathematical Art, which in its present form dates from the period of the Chinese Han dynasty (202 BC – AD 220), but may well contain much older material. Liu Hui (c. 3rd century) established rules for adding and subtracting negative numbers. By the 7th century, Indian mathematicians such as Brahmagupta were describing the use of negative numbers. Islamic mathematicians further developed the rules of subtracting and multiplying negative numbers and solved problems with negative coefficients. Prior to the concept of negative numbers, mathematicians such as Diophantus considered negative solutions to problems "false" and equations requiring negative solutions were described as absurd. Western mathematicians like Leibniz held that negative numbers were invalid, but still used them in calculations.

== Introduction ==
=== The number line ===
The relationship between negative numbers, positive numbers, and zero is often expressed in the form of a number line:

The number line

Numbers appearing farther to the right on this line are greater, while numbers appearing farther to the left are lesser. Thus zero appears in the middle, with the positive numbers to the right and the negative numbers to the left.

Note that a negative number with greater magnitude is considered less. For example, even though (positive) 8 is greater than (positive) 5, written

8 > 5

negative 8 is considered to be less than negative 5:

−8 < −5.

=== Signed numbers ===
In the context of negative numbers, a number that is greater than zero is referred to as positive. Thus every real number other than zero is either positive or negative, while zero itself is not considered to have a sign. Positive numbers are sometimes written with a plus sign in front, e.g. +3 denotes a positive three.

Because zero is neither positive nor negative, the term nonnegative is sometimes used to refer to a number that is either positive or zero, while nonpositive is used to refer to a number that is either negative or zero. Zero is a neutral number.

=== As the result of subtraction ===
Negative numbers can be thought of as resulting from the subtraction of a larger number from a smaller. For example, negative three is the result of subtracting three from zero:

0 − 3 = −3.

In general, the subtraction of a larger number from a smaller yields a negative result, with the magnitude of the result being the difference between the two numbers. For example,

5 − 8 = −3

since 8 − 5 = 3.

== Everyday uses of negative numbers ==
=== Sport ===
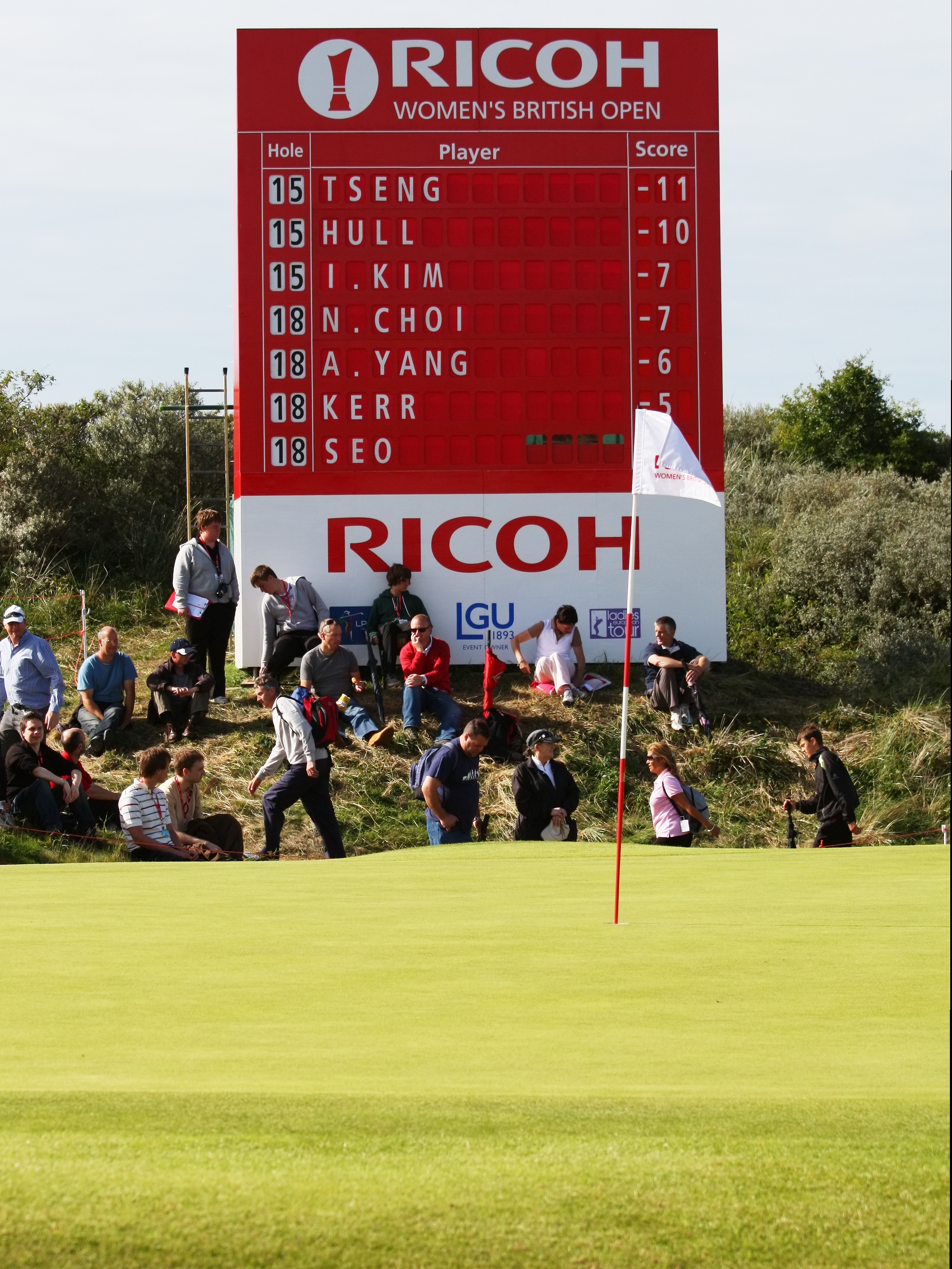
Negative golf scores relative to par.
- Goal difference in association football and hockey; points difference in rugby football; net run rate in cricket; golf scores relative to par.
- Plus-minus differential in ice hockey: the difference in total goals scored for the team (+) and against the team (−) when a particular player is on the ice is the player's +/− rating. Players can have a negative (+/−) rating.
- Run differential in baseball: the run differential is negative if the team allows more runs than they scored.
- Clubs may be deducted points for breaches of the laws, and thus have a negative points total until they have earned at least that many points that season.
- Lap (or sector) times in Formula 1 may be given as the difference compared to a previous lap (or sector) (such as the previous record, or the lap just completed by a driver in front), and will be positive if slower and negative if faster.
- In some athletics events, such as sprint races, the hurdles, the triple jump and the long jump, the wind assistance is measured and recorded, and is positive for a tailwind and negative for a headwind.

=== Science ===
- Temperatures which are colder than 0 °C or 0 °F.
- Latitudes south of the equator and longitudes west of the prime meridian.
- Topographical features of the earth's surface are given a height above sea level, which can be negative (e.g. the surface elevation of the Dead Sea or Death Valley, or the elevation of the Thames Tideway Tunnel).
- Electrical circuits. When a battery is connected in reverse polarity, the voltage applied is said to be the opposite of its rated voltage. For example, a 6-volt battery connected in reverse applies a voltage of −6 volts.
- Ions have a positive or negative electrical charge.

=== Finance ===
- Financial statements can include negative balances, indicated either by a minus sign or by enclosing the balance in parentheses. Examples include bank account overdrafts and business losses (negative earnings).
- The annual percentage growth in a country's GDP might be negative, which is one indicator of being in a recession.
- Occasionally, a rate of inflation may be negative (deflation), indicating a fall in average prices.
- The daily change in a share price or stock market index, such as the FTSE 100 or the Dow Jones.
- A negative number in financing is synonymous with "debt" and "deficit" which are also known as "being in the red".
- Interest rates can be negative, when the lender is charged to deposit their money.

=== Other ===
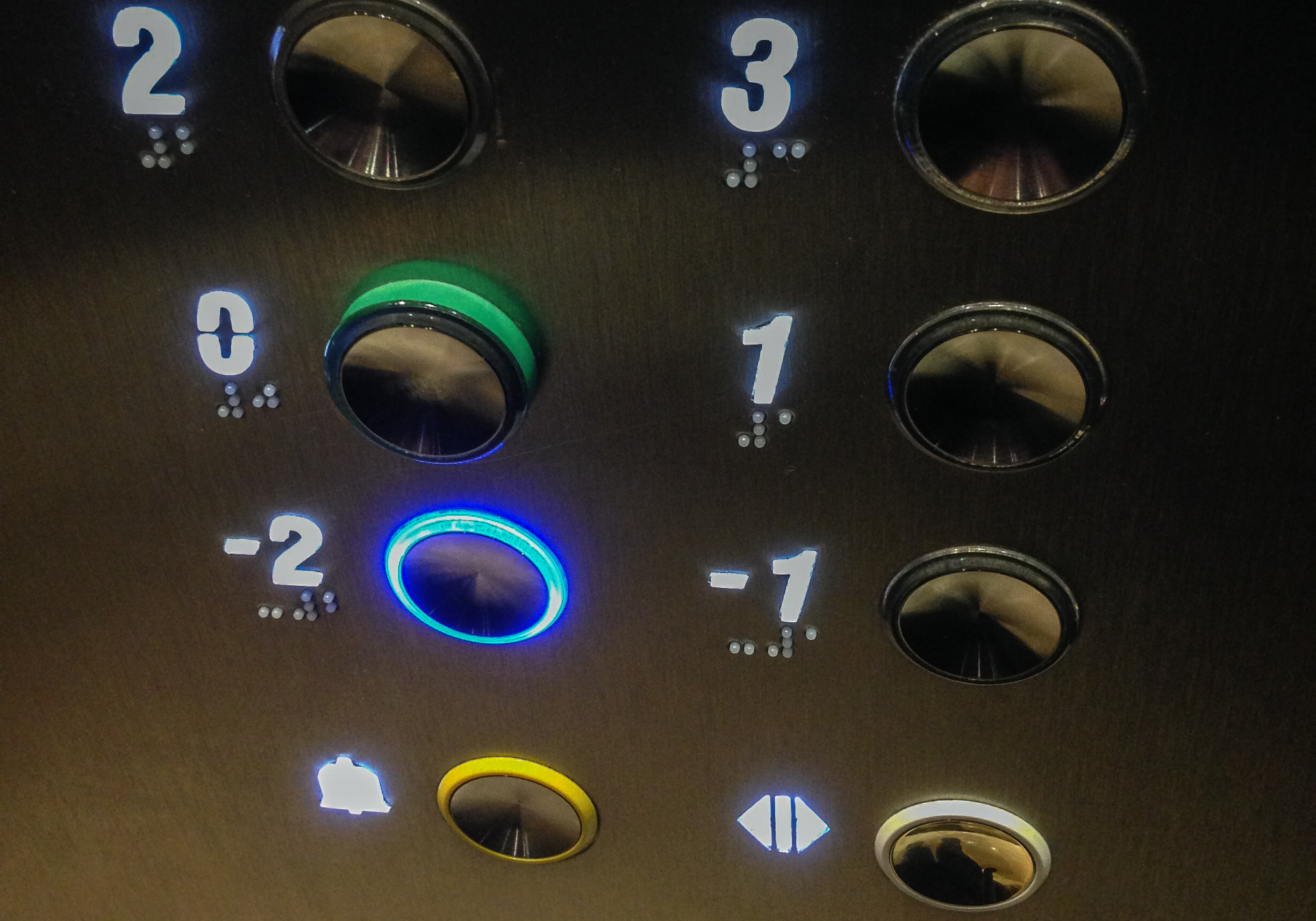
Negative story numbers in an elevator.

- The numbering of stories in a building below the ground floor.
- When playing an audio file on a portable media player, such as an iPod, the screen display may show the time remaining as a negative number, which increases up to zero time remaining at the same rate as the time already played increases from zero.
- Television game shows:
  - Participants on QI often finish with a negative points score.
  - Teams on University Challenge have a negative score if their first answers are incorrect and interrupt the question.
  - Jeopardy! has a negative money score – contestants play for an amount of money and any incorrect answer that costs them more than what they have now can result in a negative score.
  - In The Price Is Right's pricing game Buy or Sell, if an amount of money is lost that is more than the amount currently in the bank, it incurs a negative score.
- The change in support for a political party between elections, known as swing.
- A politician's approval rating.
- In video games, a negative number indicates loss of life, damage, a score penalty, or consumption of a resource, depending on the genre of the simulation.
- Employees with flexible working hours may have a negative balance on their timesheet if they have worked fewer total hours than contracted to that point. Employees may be able to take more than their annual holiday allowance in a year, and carry forward a negative balance to the next year.
- Transposing notes on an electronic keyboard are shown on the display with positive numbers for increases and negative numbers for decreases, e.g. "−1" for one semitone down.

== Arithmetic involving negative numbers ==
The minus sign "−" signifies the operator for both the binary (two-operand) operation of subtraction (as in y − z) and the unary (one-operand) operation of negation (as in −x, or twice in −(−x)). A special case of unary negation occurs when it operates on a positive number, in which case the result is a negative number (as in −5).

The ambiguity of the "−" symbol does not generally lead to ambiguity in arithmetical expressions, because the order of operations makes only one interpretation or the other possible for each "−". However, it can lead to confusion and be difficult for a person to understand an expression when operator symbols appear adjacent to one another. A solution can be to parenthesize the unary "−" along with its operand.

For example, the expression 7 + −5 may be clearer if written 7 + (−5) (even though they mean exactly the same thing formally). The subtraction expression 7 − 5 is a different expression that doesn't represent the same operations, but it evaluates to the same result.

Sometimes in elementary schools a number may be prefixed by a superscript minus sign or plus sign to explicitly distinguish negative and positive numbers as in

^{−}2 + ^{−}5 gives ^{−}7.

=== Addition ===
A visual representation of the addition of positive and negative numbers. Larger balls represent numbers with greater magnitude.

Addition of two negative numbers is very similar to addition of two positive numbers. For example,

(−3) + (−5) = −8.

The idea is that two debts can be combined into a single debt of greater magnitude.

When adding together a mixture of positive and negative numbers, one can think of the negative numbers as positive quantities being subtracted. For example:

8 + (−3) = 8 − 3 = 5 and (−2) + 7 = 7 − 2 = 5.

In the first example, a credit of 8 is combined with a debt of 3, which yields a total credit of 5. If the negative number has greater magnitude, then the result is negative:

(−8) + 3 = 3 − 8 = −5 and 2 + (−7) = 2 − 7 = −5.

Here the credit is less than the debt, so the net result is a debt.

=== Subtraction ===
As discussed above, it is possible for the subtraction of two non-negative numbers to yield a negative answer:

5 − 8 = −3

In general, subtraction of a positive number yields the same result as the addition of a negative number of equal magnitude. Thus

5 − 8 = 5 + (−8) = −3

and

(−3) − 5 = (−3) + (−5) = −8

On the other hand, subtracting a negative number yields the same result as the addition a positive number of equal magnitude. (The idea is that losing a debt is the same thing as gaining a credit.) Thus

3 − (−5) = 3 + 5 = 8

and

(−5) − (−8) = (−5) + 8 = 3.

=== Multiplication ===
A multiplication by a negative number can be seen as a change of direction of the vector of magnitude equal to the absolute value of the product of the factors.

When multiplying numbers, the magnitude of the product is always just the product of the two magnitudes. The sign of the product is determined by the following rules:

- The product of one positive number and one negative number is negative.
- The product of two negative numbers is positive.

Thus

(−2) × 3 = −6

and

(−2) × (−3) = 6.

The reason behind the first example is simple: adding three −2s together yields −6:

(−2) × 3 = (−2) + (−2) + (−2) = −6.

The reasoning behind the second example is more complicated. The idea again is that losing a debt is the same thing as gaining a credit. In this case, losing two debts of three each is the same as gaining a credit of six:

(−2 debts ) × (−3 each) = +6 credit.

The convention that a product of two negative numbers is positive is also necessary for multiplication to follow the distributive law. In this case, we know that

(−2) × (−3) + 2 × (−3) = (−2 + 2) × (−3) = 0 × (−3) = 0.

Since 2 × (−3) = −6, the product (−2) × (−3) must equal 6.

These rules lead to another (equivalent) rule—the sign of any product a × b depends on the sign of a as follows:

- if a is positive, then the sign of a × b is the same as the sign of b, and
- if a is negative, then the sign of a × b is the opposite of the sign of b.

The justification for why the product of two negative numbers is a positive number can be observed in the analysis of complex numbers.

=== Division ===
The sign rules for division are the same as for multiplication. For example,

8 ÷ (−2) = −4,
(−8) ÷ 2 = −4,

and

(−8) ÷ (−2) = 4.

If dividend and divisor have the same sign, the result is positive, if they have different signs the result is negative.

== Negation ==
The negative version of a positive number is referred to as its negation. For example, −3 is the negation of the positive number 3. The sum of a number and its negation is equal to zero:

3 + (−3) = 0.

That is, the negation of a positive number is the additive inverse of the number.

Using algebra, we may write this principle as an algebraic identity:

x + (−x) = 0.

This identity holds for any positive number x. It can be made to hold for all real numbers by extending the definition of negation to include zero and negative numbers. Specifically:

- The negation of 0 is 0, and
- The negation of a negative number is the corresponding positive number.

For example, the negation of −3 is +3. In general,

−(−x) = x.

The absolute value of a number is the non-negative number with the same magnitude. For example, the absolute value of −3 and the absolute value of 3 are both equal to 3, and the absolute value of 0 is 0.

== Formal construction of negative integers ==
In a similar manner to rational numbers, we can extend the natural numbers $\mathbb{N}$ to the integers $\mathbb{Z}$ by defining integers as an ordered pair of natural numbers (a, b). We can extend addition and multiplication to these pairs with the following rules:

(a, b) + (c, d) = (a + c, b + d)
(a, b) × (c, d) = (a × c + b × d, a × d + b × c)

We define an equivalence relation ~ upon these pairs with the following rule:

(a, b) ~ (c, d) if and only if a + d = b + c.

This equivalence relation is compatible with the addition and multiplication defined above, and we may define $\mathbb{Z}$ to be the quotient set $\mathbb{N}^2/\sim$, i.e. we identify two pairs (a, b) and (c, d) if they are equivalent in the above sense. Note that $\mathbb{Z}$, equipped with these operations of addition and multiplication, is a ring, and is in fact, the prototypical example of a ring.

We can also define a total order on $\mathbb{Z}$ by writing

(a, b) ≤ (c, d) if and only if a + d ≤ b + c.

This will lead to an additive zero of the form (a, a), an additive inverse of (a, b) of the form (b, a), a multiplicative unit of the form (a + 1, a), and a definition of subtraction

(a, b) − (c, d) = (a + d, b + c).

This construction is a special case of the Grothendieck construction.

=== Uniqueness ===
The additive inverse of a number is unique, as is shown by the following proof. As mentioned above, an additive inverse of a number is defined as a value which when added to the number yields zero.

Let x be a number and let y be its additive inverse. Suppose y′ is another additive inverse of x. By definition,
$$x + y' = 0, \quad \text{and} \quad x + y = 0.$$

And so, x + y′ = x + y. Using the law of cancellation for addition, it is seen that y′ = y. Thus y is equal to any other additive inverse of x. That is, y is the unique additive inverse of x.

== History ==
For a long time, understanding of negative numbers was delayed by the impossibility of having a negative-number amount of a physical object, for example "minus-three apples", and negative solutions to problems were considered "false".

In Hellenistic Egypt, the Greek mathematician Diophantus in the 3rd century AD referred to an equation that was equivalent to $4x + 20 = 4$ (which has a negative solution) in Arithmetica, saying that the equation was absurd. For this reason Greek geometers were able to solve geometrically all forms of the quadratic equation which give positive roots, while they could take no account of others.

Negative numbers appear for the first time in history in the Nine Chapters on the Mathematical Art (九章算術, Jiǔ zhāng suàn-shù), which in its present form dates from the Han period, but may well contain much older material. The mathematician Liu Hui (c. 3rd century) established rules for the addition and subtraction of negative numbers. The historian Jean-Claude Martzloff theorized that the importance of duality in Chinese natural philosophy made it easier for the Chinese to accept the idea of negative numbers. The Chinese were able to solve simultaneous equations involving negative numbers. The Nine Chapters used red counting rods to denote positive coefficients and black rods for negative. This system is the exact opposite of contemporary printing of positive and negative numbers in the fields of banking, accounting, and commerce, wherein red numbers denote negative values and black numbers signify positive values. Liu Hui writes:

Now there are two opposite kinds of counting rods for gains and losses, let them be called positive and negative. Red counting rods are positive, black counting rods are negative.

The ancient Indian Bakhshali Manuscript carried out calculations with negative numbers, using "+" as a negative sign. The date of the manuscript is uncertain. LV Gurjar dates it no later than the 4th century, Hoernle dates it between the third and fourth centuries, Ayyangar and Pingree dates it to the 8th or 9th centuries, and George Gheverghese Joseph dates it to about AD 400 and no later than the early 7th century.

During the 7th century AD, negative numbers were used in India to represent debts. The Indian mathematician Brahmagupta, in Brahma-Sphuta-Siddhanta (written c. AD 630), discussed the use of negative numbers to produce a general form quadratic formula similar to the one in use today.

In the 9th century, Islamic mathematicians were familiar with negative numbers from the works of Indian mathematicians, but the recognition and use of negative numbers during this period remained timid. Al-Khwarizmi in his Al-jabr wa'l-muqabala (from which the word "algebra" derives) did not use negative numbers or negative coefficients. But within fifty years, Abu Kamil illustrated the rules of signs for expanding the multiplication $(a \pm b)(c \pm d)$, and al-Karaji wrote in his al-Fakhrī that "negative quantities must be counted as terms". In the 10th century, Abū al-Wafā' al-Būzjānī considered debts as negative numbers in A Book on What Is Necessary from the Science of Arithmetic for Scribes and Businessmen.

By the 12th century, al-Karaji's successors were to state the general rules of signs and use them to solve polynomial divisions. As al-Samaw'al writes:

the product of a negative number—al-nāqiṣ (loss)—by a positive number—al-zāʾid (gain)—is negative, and by a negative number is positive. If we subtract a negative number from a higher negative number, the remainder is their negative difference. The difference remains positive if we subtract a negative number from a lower negative number. If we subtract a negative number from a positive number, the remainder is their positive sum. If we subtract a positive number from an empty power (martaba khāliyya), the remainder is the same negative, and if we subtract a negative number from an empty power, the remainder is the same positive number.

In the 12th century in India, Bhāskara II gave negative roots for quadratic equations but rejected them because they were inappropriate in the context of the problem. He stated that a negative value is "in this case not to be taken, for it is inadequate; people do not approve of negative roots."

Fibonacci allowed negative solutions in financial problems where they could be interpreted as debits (chapter 13 of Liber Abaci, 1202) and later as losses (in Flos, 1225).

In the 15th century, Nicolas Chuquet, a Frenchman, used negative numbers as exponents but referred to them as "absurd numbers".

Michael Stifel dealt with negative numbers in his 1544 AD Arithmetica Integra, where he also called them numeri absurdi (absurd numbers).

In 1545, Gerolamo Cardano, in his Ars Magna, provided the first satisfactory treatment of negative numbers in Europe. He did not allow negative numbers in his consideration of cubic equations, so he had to treat, for example, $x^3 + a x = b$ separately from $x^3 = a x + b$ (with $a, b > 0$ in both cases). In all, Cardano was driven to the study of thirteen types of cubic equations, each with all negative terms moved to the other side of the = sign to make them positive. (Cardano also dealt with complex numbers, but understandably liked them even less.)

== See also ==
- Additive inverse
- History of zero
- Integers
- Positive and negative parts
- Rational numbers
- Real numbers
- Sign function
- Sign (mathematics)
- Signed number representations
- Signed zero
