= Additive inverse =

Number that, when added to the original number, yields the additive identity

In mathematics, the additive inverse of an element x, denoted −x, is the element that when added to x, yields the additive identity. This additive identity is often the number 0 (zero), but it can also refer to a more generalized zero element.

In elementary mathematics, the additive inverse is often referred to as the opposite number, or the negative of a number. The unary operation of arithmetic negation is closely related to subtraction and is important in solving algebraic equations. Not all sets where addition is defined have an additive inverse, such as the natural numbers.

== Common examples ==
When working with integers, rational numbers, real numbers, and complex numbers, the additive inverse of any number can be found by multiplying it by −1.

These complex numbers, two of eight values of ^{8}√1, are mutually opposite

Simple cases of additive inverses
$n$	$-n$
$7$	$-7$
$0.35$	$-0.35$
$\frac{1}{4}$	$-\frac{1}{4}$
$\pi$	$-\pi$
$1 + 2i$	$-1 - 2i$

The concept can also be extended to algebraic expressions, which is often used when balancing equations.

Additive inverses of algebraic expressions
$n$	$-n$
$a - b$	$-(a - b) = -a + b$
$2x^2 + 5$	$-(2x^2 + 5) = -2x^2 - 5$
$\frac{1}{x + 2}$	$-\frac{1}{x+2}$
$\sqrt{2}\sin{\theta} - \sqrt{3}\cos{2\theta}$	$-(\sqrt{2}\sin{\theta} - \sqrt{3}\cos{2\theta}) = -\sqrt{2}\sin{\theta} + \sqrt{3}\cos{2\theta}$

== Relation to subtraction ==
The additive inverse is closely related to subtraction, which can be viewed as an addition using the inverse:

a − b = a + (−b).

Conversely, the additive inverse can be thought of as subtraction from zero:

−a = 0 − a.

This connection lead to the minus sign being used for both opposite magnitudes and subtraction as far back as the 17th century. While this notation is standard today, it was met with opposition at the time, as some mathematicians felt it could be unclear and lead to errors.

== Formal definition ==
Given an algebraic structure defined under addition $(S, +)$ with an additive identity $e \in S$, an element $x \in S$ has an additive inverse $y$ if and only if $y \in S$, $x + y = e$, and $y + x = e$.

Addition is typically only used to refer to a commutative operation, but for some systems of numbers, such as floating point, it might not be associative. When it is associative, so $(a + b) + c = a + (b + c)$, the left and right inverses, if they exist, will agree, and the additive inverse will be unique. In non-associative cases, the left and right inverses may disagree, and in these cases, the inverse is not considered to exist.

The definition requires closure, that the additive element $y$ be found in $S$. However, despite being able to add the natural numbers together, the set of natural numbers does not include the additive inverse values. This is because the additive inverse of a natural number (e.g., $-3$ for $3$) is not a natural number; it is an integer. Therefore, the natural numbers in set $S$ do have additive inverses and their associated inverses are negative numbers.

== Further examples ==
- In a vector space, the additive inverse −v (often called the opposite vector of v) has the same magnitude as v and but the opposite direction.
- In modular arithmetic, the modular additive inverse of x is the number a such that a + x ≡ 0 (mod n) and always exists. For example, the inverse of 3 modulo 11 is 8, as 3 + 8 ≡ 0 (mod 11).
- In a Boolean ring, which has elements $\{0, 1\}$ addition is often defined as the symmetric difference. So $0 + 0 = 0$, $0 + 1 = 1$, $1 + 0 = 1$, and $1 + 1 = 0$. Our additive identity is 0, and both elements are their own additive inverse as $0 + 0 = 0$ and $1 + 1 = 0$.

== See also ==
- Absolute value (related through the identity |−x| = |x|).
- Inverse element
- Inverse function
- Involution (mathematics)
- Monoid
- Multiplicative inverse
- Reflection (mathematics)
- Reflection symmetry
- Semigroup
