= P320 =

P320 may refer to:

- Athlon II X2 P320, an eighth-generation CPU targeted at the consumer market
- SIG Sauer P320, a semi-automatic pistol
- Ligier JS P320, an LMP3 sports racing car
