= Population count =

Population count may refer to:

- Census, the procedure of systematically acquiring, recording, and calculating information about a given population
- Hamming weight of a string, the number of symbols that are different from the zero-symbol of the alphabet used
