= Trailing zero =

Zero after the final non-zero digit of a number

A trailing zero is any 0 digit that comes after the last nonzero digit in a number string in positional notation. For digits before the decimal point, the trailing zeros between the decimal point and the last nonzero digit are necessary for conveying the magnitude of a number and cannot be omitted (e.g. 100), while leading zeros – zeros occurring before the decimal point and before the first nonzero digit – can be omitted without changing the meaning (e.g. 001). Any zeros appearing to the right of the last non-zero digit after the decimal point do not affect its value (e.g. 0.100). Thus, decimal notation often does not use trailing zeros that come after the decimal point. However, trailing zeros that come after the decimal point may be used to indicate the number of significant figures, for example in a measurement, and in that context, "simplifying" a number by removing trailing zeros would be analogous to rounding as it reduces precision; for example, 12.00 excludes the possibility that the number is rounded from 12.34, while 12 does not.

The number of trailing zeros in a non-zero base-b integer n equals the exponent of the highest power of b that divides n. For example, 14000 has three trailing zeros and is therefore divisible by 1000 = 10^{3}, but not by 10^{4}. This property is useful when looking for small factors in integer factorization. Some computer architectures have a count trailing zeros operation in their instruction set for efficiently determining the number of trailing zero bits in a machine word.

In pharmacy, trailing zeros are omitted from dose values to prevent misreading.

== Factorial ==
The number of trailing zeros in the decimal representation of n!, the factorial of a non-negative integer n, is simply the multiplicity of the prime factor 5 in n!. This can be determined with this special case of de Polignac's formula:

$$f(n) = \sum_{i=1}^k \left \lfloor \frac{n}{5^i} \right \rfloor =
\left \lfloor \frac{n}{5} \right \rfloor + \left \lfloor \frac{n}{5^2} \right \rfloor + \left \lfloor \frac{n}{5^3} \right \rfloor + \cdots + \left \lfloor \frac{n}{5^k} \right \rfloor, \,$$

where k must be chosen such that

$$5^{k+1} > n,\,$$

more precisely

$$5^{k} \le n < 5^{k+1},$$
$$k = \left \lfloor \log_{5} n \right \rfloor,$$

and $\lfloor a \rfloor$ denotes the floor function applied to a. For n = 0, 1, 2, ... this is

0, 0, 0, 0, 0, 1, 1, 1, 1, 1, 2, 2, 2, 2, 2, 3, 3, 3, 3, 3, 4, 4, 4, 4, 4, 6, ... (sequence A027868 in the OEIS).

For example, 5^{3} > 32, and therefore 32! = 263130836933693530167218012160000000 ends in

$$\left \lfloor \frac{32}{5} \right \rfloor + \left \lfloor \frac{32}{5^2} \right \rfloor = 6 + 1 = 7\,$$

zeros. If n < 5, the inequality is satisfied by k = 0; in that case the sum is empty, giving the answer 0.

The formula actually counts the number of factors 5 in n!, but since there are at least as many factors 2, this is equivalent to the number of factors 10, each of which gives one more trailing zero.

Defining

$$q_i = \left \lfloor \frac{n}{5^i} \right \rfloor,\,$$

the following recurrence relation holds:

$$\begin{align}q_0\,\,\,\,\, & = \,\,\,n,\quad \\
q_{i+1} & = \left \lfloor \frac{q_i}{5} \right \rfloor.\,\end{align}$$

This can be used to simplify the computation of the terms of the summation, which can be stopped as soon as q_{i} reaches zero. The condition 5^{k+1} > n is equivalent to q_{k+1} = 0.

== See also ==
- Trailing digit
