= List of AMD Athlon II processors =

The AMD Athlon II family is a 64-bit microprocessor family from Advanced Micro Devices (AMD), based on the K10 microarchitecture. As with the Phenom II, it's an improved second generation of said microarchitecture.

== Desktop processors ==
=== "Zosma" (E0, 45 nm, Quad-core) ===
- Chip harvests from Thuban with two cores and L3 cache disabled
- All models support: MMX, SSE, SSE2, SSE3, SSE4a, ABM, Enhanced 3DNow!, NX bit, AMD64, Cool'n'Quiet, AMD-V, Turbo Core (AMD equivalent of Intel Turbo Boost)
- Memory support: DDR2 up to PC2-8500, DDR3 up to PC3-10600 (Socket AM3 only)

Model number	Step.	Freq.	L2 Cache	HT	Multi (Note: The clock multiplier applies to the 200 MHz HyperTransport base clock.)	Voltage	TDP	Socket	Release date	Part number(s)
Athlon II X4 640	E0	3.0 GHz	4 × 512 KB	2 GHz	15×	0.825 - 1.400	95 W	AM3	2011	ADX640WFK42GR

=== "Propus" (C2/C3, 45 nm, Quad-core) ===
- All models support: MMX, SSE, SSE2, SSE3, SSE4a, ABM, Enhanced 3DNow!, NX bit, AMD64, Cool'n'Quiet, AMD-V
- Memory support: DDR2 up to PC2-8500 (DDR2-1066 MHz), DDR3 up to PC3-10600 (DDR3-1333 MHz) (Socket AM3 only)

Model number	Step.	Freq.	L2 Cache	HT	Multi	Voltage	TDP	Socket	Release Date	Part Number
Athlon II X4 600e	C2	2.2 GHz	4 × 512 KB	2 GHz	11×	0.775 - 1.2	45 W	AM3	October 20, 2009	AD600EHDK42GI
Athlon II X4 605e	C2	2.3 GHz	4 × 512 KB	2 GHz	11.5×	0.775 - 1.2	45 W	AM3	October 20, 2009	AD605EHDK42GI
Athlon II X4 605e	C3	2.3 GHz	4 × 512 KB	2 GHz	11.5×	0.775 - 1.25	45 W	AM3		AD605EHDK42GM
Athlon II X4 610e	C3	2.4 GHz	4 × 512 KB	2 GHz	12×	0.775 - 1.25	45 W	AM3	May 11, 2010	AD610EHDK42GM
Athlon II X4 615e	C3	2.5 GHz	4 × 512 KB	2 GHz	12.5×	0.775 - 1.25	45 W	AM3	September 21, 2010	AD615EHDK42GM
Athlon II X4 620e	C3	2.6 GHz	4 × 512 KB	2 GHz	13×	0.775 - 1.25	45 W	AM3	May 3, 2011	AD620EHDK42GM
Athlon II X4 620	C2	2.6 GHz	4 × 512 KB	2 GHz	13×	0.925 - 1.425	95 W	AM3	September 16, 2009	ADX620WFK42GI
Athlon II X4 630	C2	2.8 GHz	4 × 512 KB	2 GHz	14×	0.90 - 1.425	95 W	AM3	September 16, 2009	ADX630WFK42GI
Athlon II X4 630	C3	2.8 GHz	4 × 512 KB	2 GHz	14×	0.90 - 1.4	95 W	AM3		ADX630WFK42GM
Athlon II X4 635	C2	2.9 GHz	4 × 512 KB	2 GHz	14.5×	0.85 - 1.425	95 W	AM3	January 25, 2010	ADX635WFK42GI
Athlon II X4 635	C3	2.9 GHz	4 × 512 KB	2 GHz	14.5×	0.875 - 1.4	95 W	AM3	March 2010	ADX635WFK42GM
Athlon II X4 640	C3	3.0 GHz	4 × 512 KB	2 GHz	15×	0.875 - 1.425	95 W	AM3	May 11, 2010	ADX640WFK42GM
Athlon II X4 645	C3	3.1 GHz	4 × 512 KB	2 GHz	15.5×	0.875 - 1.425	95 W	AM3	September 21, 2010	ADX645WFK42GM
Athlon II X4 650	C3	3.2 GHz	4 × 512 KB	2 GHz	16×	0.875 - 1.425	95 W	AM3	Q2 2011	ADX650WFK42GM

=== "Rana" (C2/C3, 45 nm, Tri-core) ===
- Chip harvests from Propus and Deneb with one core disabled
- All models support: MMX, SSE, SSE2, SSE3, SSE4a, ABM, Enhanced 3DNow!, NX bit, AMD64, Cool'n'Quiet, AMD-V
- Memory support: DDR2 up to PC2-8500 (DDR2-1066 MHz), DDR3 up to PC3-10600 (DDR3-1333 MHz) (Socket AM3 only)

Model number	Step.	Freq.	L2 Cache	HT	Multi	Voltage	TDP	Socket	Release Date	Part Number
Athlon II X3 400e	C2	2.2 GHz	3x 512 KB	2 GHz	11×	0.775-1.2	45 W	AM3	October 20, 2009	AD400EHDK32GI
Athlon II X3 405e	C2	2.3 GHz	3 × 512 KB	2 GHz	11.5×	0.775-1.2	45 W	AM3	October 20, 2009	AD405EHDK32GI
Athlon II X3 405e	C3	2.3 GHz	3 × 512 KB	2 GHz	11.5×	0.775 - 1.25	45 W	AM3	March 2010	AD405EHDK32GM
Athlon II X3 415e	C3	2.5 GHz	3 × 512 KB	2 GHz	12.5×	0.775 - 1.25	45 W	AM3	May 11, 2010	AD415EHDK32GM
Athlon II X3 420e	C3	2.6 GHz	3 × 512 KB	2 GHz	13×	0.775 - 1.25	45 W	AM3	September 21, 2010	AD420EHDK32GM
Athlon II X3 425e	C3	2.7 GHz	3 × 512 KB	2 GHz	13.5×	0.775 - 1.25	45 W	AM3	May 3, 2011	AD425EHDK32GM
Athlon II X3 425	C2	2.7 GHz	3 × 512 KB	2 GHz	13.5×	0.85 - 1.425	95 W	AM3	October 20, 2009	ADX425WFK32GI
Athlon II X3 435	C2	2.9 GHz	3 × 512 KB	2 GHz	14.5×	0.85 - 1.425	95 W	AM3	October 20, 2009	ADX435WFK32GI
Athlon II X3 440	C2	3.0 GHz	3 × 512 KB	2 GHz	15×	0.85 - 1.425	95 W	AM3	January 25, 2010	ADX440WFK32GI
Athlon II X3 440	C3	3.0 GHz	3 × 512 KB	2 GHz	15×	0.85 - 1.4	95 W	AM3	March 2010	ADX440WFK32GM
Athlon II X3 445	C3	3.1 GHz	3 × 512 KB	2 GHz	15.5×	0.85 - 1.4	95 W	AM3	May 11, 2010	ADX445WFK32GM
Athlon II X3 450	C3	3.2 GHz	3 × 512 KB	2 GHz	16×	0.85 - 1.4	95 W	AM3	September 21, 2010	ADX450WFK32GM
Athlon II X3 455	C3	3.3 GHz	3 × 512 KB	2 GHz	16.5×	0.85 - 1.4	95 W	AM3	December 7, 2010	ADX455WFK32GM
Athlon II X3 460	C3	3.4 GHz	3 × 512 KB	2 GHz	17×	0.85 - 1.4	95 W	AM3	May 3, 2011	ADX460WFK32GM

=== "Regor" (C2/C3, 45 nm, Dual-core) ===
- Some are chip harvests from Propus or Deneb with two cores disabled
- Most Regor-based processors feature double the L2 cache per core (1 MB) as other cpus
- Some units of the 210E, 215 and 220 are able to unlock 2 disabled cores sometimes with L3 cache if the motherboard BIOS enables that unlocking.
- All models support: MMX, SSE, SSE2, SSE3, SSE4a, ABM, Enhanced 3DNow!, NX bit, AMD64, Cool'n'Quiet, AMD-V
- Memory support: DDR2 up to PC2-8500, DDR3 up to PC3-8500 (DDR3-1066 MHz) (Socket AM3 only)

Model number	Step.	Freq.	L2 Cache	HT	Multi	Voltage	TDP	Socket	Release Date	Part Number
Athlon II X2 250u	C2	1.6 GHz	2 × 1 MB	2 GHz	8×	0.85 - 1.15	25 W	AM3	October 20, 2009	AD250USCK23GQ
Athlon II X2 260u	C2	1.8 GHz	2 × 1 MB	2 GHz	9×	0.85 - 1.15	25 W	AM3	October 20, 2009	AD260USCK23GQ
Athlon II X2 260u	C3	1.8 GHz	2 × 1 MB	2 GHz	9×	0.85 - 1.15	25 W	AM3	March 2010	AD260USCK23GM
Athlon II X2 270u	C3	2.0 GHz	2 × 1 MB	2 GHz	10×	0.825 - 1.15	25 W	AM3	September 21, 2010	AD270USCK23GM
Athlon II X2 210e	C2	2.6 GHz	2 × 512 KB	2 GHz	13×	0.825 - 1.30	45 W	AM3	September 21, 2010	AD210EHDK22GI
Athlon II X2 215	C2	2.7 GHz	2 × 512 KB	2 GHz	13.5×	0.85 - 1.425	65 W	AM3	October 20, 2009	ADX215OCK22GQ
Athlon II X2 215	C3	2.7 GHz	2 × 512 KB	2 GHz	13.5×	0.90 - 1.40	65 W	AM3	July 2010	ADX215OCK22GM
Athlon II X2 220	C3	2.8 GHz	2 × 512 KB	2 GHz	14×	0.90 - 1.40	65 W	AM3	September 21, 2010	ADX220OCK22GM
Athlon II X2 235e	C2	2.7 GHz	2 × 1 MB	2 GHz	13.5×	0.775 - 1.35	45 W	AM3	October 20, 2009	AD235EHDK23GQ
Athlon II X2 240	C2	2.8 GHz	2 × 1 MB	2 GHz	14×	0.85 - 1.425	65 W	AM3	July 23, 2009	ADX240OCK23GQ
Athlon II X2 240e	C2	2.8 GHz	2 × 1 MB	2 GHz	14×	0.775 - 1.35	45 W	AM3	October 20, 2009	AD240EHDK23GQ
Athlon II X2 240e	C3	2.8 GHz	2 × 1 MB	2 GHz	14×	0.875 - 1.4	45 W	AM3	May 11, 2010	AD240EHDK23GM
Athlon II X2 245	C2	2.9 GHz	2 × 1 MB	2 GHz	14.5×	0.85 - 1.425	65 W	AM3	July 23, 2009	ADX245OCK23GQ
Athlon II X2 245	C3	2.9 GHz	2 × 1 MB	2 GHz	14.5×	0.85 - 1.40	65 W	AM3	July 2010	ADX245OCK23GM
Athlon II X2 245e	C3	2.9 GHz	2 × 1 MB	2 GHz	14.5×	0.875 - 1.4	45 W	AM3	May 11, 2010	AD245EHDK23GM
Athlon II X2 250e	C3	3.0 GHz	2 × 1 MB	2 GHz	15×	0.875 - 1.4	45 W	AM3	September 21, 2010	AD250EHDK23GM
Athlon II X2 250	C2	3.0 GHz	2 × 1 MB	2 GHz	15×	0.85 - 1.425	65 W	AM3	June 2, 2009	ADX250OCK23GQ
Athlon II X2 250	C3	3.0 GHz	2 × 1 MB	2 GHz	15×	0.85 - 1.40	65 W	AM3	July 2010	ADX250OCK23GM
Athlon II X2 255	C2	3.1 GHz	2 × 1 MB	2 GHz	15.5×	0.85 - 1.425	65 W	AM3	January 25, 2010	ADX255OCK23GQ
Athlon II X2 255	C3	3.1 GHz	2 × 1 MB	2 GHz	15.5×	0.85 - 1.4	65 W	AM3	March 2010	ADX255OCK23GM
Athlon II X2 260	C3	3.2 GHz	2 × 1 MB	2 GHz	16×	0.825 - 1.40	65 W	AM3	May 11, 2010	ADX260OCK23GM
Athlon II X2 265	C3	3.3 GHz	2 × 1 MB	2 GHz	16.5×	0.825 - 1.40	65 W	AM3	September 21, 2010	ADX265OCK23GM
Athlon II X2 270	C3	3.4 GHz	2 × 1 MB	2 GHz	17×	0.825 - 1.40	65 W	AM3	July 2011	ADX270OCK23GM
Athlon II X2 280	C3	3.6 GHz	2 × 1 MB	2 GHz	18×	0.825 - 1.40	65 W	AM3	February 1, 2013	ADX280OCK23GM
Business Class
Athlon II X2 B22 (Note: AMD Business Class processor, availability guaranteed for 24 months after release.)	C2	2.8 GHz	2 × 1 MB	2 GHz	14×	0.85 - 1.425	65 W	AM3	October 20, 2009	ADXB22OCK23GQ
Athlon II X2 B24	C2	3.0 GHz	2 × 1 MB	2 GHz	15×	0.85 - 1.425	65 W	AM3	October 20, 2009	ADXB24OCK23GQ
Athlon II X2 B26	C3	3.2 GHz	2 × 1 MB	2 GHz	16×	0.85 - 1.425	65 W	AM3	May 11, 2010	ADXB26OCK23GM
Athlon II X2 B28	C3	3.4 GHz	2 × 1 MB	2 GHz	17×	0.85 - 1.425	65 W	AM3	December 7, 2010	ADXB28OCK23GM
Athlon II X2 B30	C3	3.6 GHz	2 × 1 MB	2 GHz	18×	0.85 - 1.425	65 W	AM3	2011	ADXB30OCK23GM

=== "Sargas" (C2/C3, 45 nm, Single-core) ===
- Chip harvests from Regor with one core disabled
- All models support: MMX, SSE, SSE2, SSE3, SSE4a, ABM, Enhanced 3DNow!, NX bit, AMD64, Cool'n'Quiet, AMD-V
- Memory support: DDR2 up to PC2-6400, DDR3 up to PC3-8500 (Socket AM3 only)

Model number	Step.	Freq.	L2 Cache	HT	Multi	Voltage	TDP	Socket	Release Date	Part Number
Athlon II 160u	C2	1.8 GHz	1 MB	1.8 GHz	9×	0.875 - 1.225	20 W	AM3	October 20, 2009	AD160UEAK13GM
Athlon II 170u	C3	2.0 GHz	1 MB	1.8 GHz	10×	0.875 - 1.225	20 W	AM3	May 11, 2010	AD170UEAK13GM

=== "Llano" (B0, 32nm) ===
- Platform "Lynx"
- Socket FM1
- CPU: K10 (or Husky or K10.5) with no L3 cache cores with an upgraded architecture known as Stars
  - L1 Cache: 64 KB Data per core and 64 KB Instructions per core
- MMX, Enhanced 3DNow!, SSE, SSE2, SSE3, SSE4a, ABM, NX bit, AMD64, Cool'n'Quiet, AMD-V
- Support for up to four DIMMs of up to DDR3-1866 memory
- Fabrication 32 nm on GlobalFoundries SOI process; Die size: 228 mm^{2}, with 1.178 billion transistors
- 5 GT/s UMI
- Integrated PCIe 2.0 controller

Model	Released	Fab	Stepping	Cores (threads)	Clock speed		Cache (Note: AMD in its technical documentation uses KB, which it defines as Kilobyte and as equal to 1024 bytes, and MB, which it defines as Megabyte and as equal to 1024 KB.)			Memory support	TDP	Part number(s)
Model	Released	Fab	Stepping	Cores (threads)	Base	Turbo	L1	L2	L3	Memory support	TDP	Part number(s)
Athlon II X2 221	Q1 2012	32 nm	B0	2 (2)	2.8 GHz	—N/a	64KB inst. 64KB data per core	2 × 512 KB	—N/a	DDR3-1600	65 W	AD221XOJGXBOX; AD221XOJZ22GX
Athlon II X4 631	August 15, 2011	32 nm	B0	4 (4)	2.6 GHz	—N/a	64KB inst. 64KB data per core	4 × 1 MB	—N/a	DDR3-1866	100 W	AD631XOJGXBOX; AD631XWNZ43GX
Athlon II X4 631	2012	32 nm	B0	4 (4)	2.6 GHz	—N/a	64KB inst. 64KB data per core	4 × 1 MB	—N/a	DDR3-1866	65 W	AD631XOJGXBOX; AD631XOJZ43GX
Athlon II X4 638	February 8, 2012	32 nm	B0	4 (4)	2.7 GHz	—N/a	64KB inst. 64KB data per core	4 × 1 MB	—N/a	DDR3-1866	65 W	AD638XOJGXBOX; AD638XOJZ43GX
Athlon II X4 641	February 8, 2012	32 nm	B0	4 (4)	2.8 GHz	—N/a	64KB inst. 64KB data per core	4 × 1 MB	—N/a	DDR3-1866	100 W	AD641XWNGXBOX; AD641XWNZ43GX
Athlon II X4 651	November 14, 2011	32 nm	B0	4 (4)	3.0 GHz	—N/a	64KB inst. 64KB data per core	4 × 1 MB	—N/a	DDR3-1866	100 W	AD651XWNGXBOX; AD651XWNZ43GX
Athlon II X4 651K	Q1 2012	32 nm	B0	4 (4)	3.0 GHz	—N/a	64KB inst. 64KB data per core	4 × 1 MB	—N/a	DDR3-1866	100 W	AD651KWNGXBOX; AD651KWNZ43GX

== Mobile processors ==
=== Athlon II mobile processors (Phenom-based) ===
==== "Caspian" (45 nm, Dual-core) ====
- Based on the AMD K10 microarchitecture
- Only 64 bit FPU
- All models support: MMX, SSE, SSE2, SSE3, SSE4a, ABM, Enhanced 3DNow!, NX bit, AMD64, PowerNow!, AMD-V

Model number	Frequency	L2 cache	FPU width	HT	Mult.	TDP	Socket	Release date	Part number
Athlon II M300	2.0 GHz	2 × 512 kB	64-bit	1.6 GHz	10×	35 W	Socket S1G3	September 10, 2009	AMM300DBO22GQ
Athlon II M320	2.1 GHz	2 × 512 kB	64-bit	1.6 GHz	10.5×	35 W	Socket S1G3	September 10, 2009	AMM320DBO22GQ
Athlon II M340	2.2 GHz	2 × 512 kB	64-bit	1.6 GHz	11×	35 W	Socket S1G3	September 10, 2009	AMM340DBO22GQ
Athlon II M360	2.3 GHz	2 × 512 kB	64-bit	1.6 GHz	11×	35 W	Socket S1G3	May 2010	AMM360DBO22GQ

=== Athlon II mobile processors (Phenom II-based) ===
==== "Champlain" (45 nm, Dual-core) ====
- Based on the AMD K10 microarchitecture
- Only 64 bit FPU
- All models support: MMX, SSE, SSE2, SSE3, SSE4a, ABM, Enhanced 3DNow!, NX bit, AMD64, Cool'n'Quiet, AMD-V
- Memory support: DDR3, DDR3L

Model Number	Frequency	L2 cache	FPU width	HT	Mult.	TDP	Socket	Release date	Order Part Number
Athlon II P320	2.1 GHz	2 × 512 KB	64-bit	1.6 GHz	10.5×	25 W	Socket S1G4	May 12, 2010	AMP320SGR22GM
Athlon II P340	2.2 GHz	2 × 512 KB	64-bit	1.6 GHz	11×	25 W	Socket S1G4	October 4, 2010	AMP340SGR22GM
Athlon II P360	2.3 GHz	2 × 512 KB	64-bit	1.6 GHz	11.5×	25 W	Socket S1G4	January 4, 2011	AMP360SGR22GM
Athlon II N330	2.3 GHz	2 × 512 KB	64-bit	1.6 GHz	11.5×	35 W	Socket S1G4	May 12, 2010	AMN330DCR22GM
Athlon II N350	2.4 GHz	2 × 512 KB	64-bit	1.6 GHz	12×	35 W	Socket S1G4	October 4, 2010	AMN350DCR22GM
Athlon II N370	2.5 GHz	2 × 512 KB	64-bit	1.6 GHz	12.5×	35 W	Socket S1G4	January 4, 2011	AMN370DCR22GM

=== Athlon II Neo mobile processors (Phenom II-based) ===
- Based on the AMD K10 microarchitecture
- Only 64 bit FPU
- All models support: MMX, SSE, SSE2, SSE3, SSE4a, ABM, Enhanced 3DNow!, NX bit, AMD64, Cool'n'Quiet, AMD-V
- Memory support: DDR3, DDR3L

==== "Geneva" (45 nm, Dual-core) ====
Model number	Frequency	L2 Cache	FPU width	HT	Mult.	TDP	Socket	Release date	Order Part Number
Athlon II Neo N36L	1.3 GHz	2 × 1 MB	64-bit	1.0 GHz	6.5×	12 W	ASB2	April 26, 2010	AEN36LLAV23GME
Athlon II Neo K325	1.3 GHz	2 × 1 MB	64-bit	1.0 GHz	6.5×	12 W	ASB2	May 12, 2010	AMK325LAV23GM
Athlon II Neo K345	1.4 GHz	2 × 1 MB	64-bit	1.0 GHz	7×	12 W	ASB2	January 4, 2011	AMK345LAV23GM

==== "Geneva" (45 nm, Single-core) ====
Model number	Frequency	L2 Cache	FPU width	HT	Mult.	TDP	Socket	Release date	Order Part Number
Athlon II Neo K125	1.7 GHz	1 MB	64-bit	1.0 GHz	8.5×	12 W	ASB2	May 12, 2010	AMK125LAV13GM
Athlon II Neo K145	1.8 GHz	1 MB	64-bit	1.0 GHz	9×	12 W	ASB2	January 4, 2011	AMK145LAV13GM

== See also ==
- Athlon II
