= Find first set =

Family of related bitwise operations on machine words

In computer software and hardware, find first set (ffs) or find first one is a bit operation which returns the index or position of the least significant 'one' bit in its argument, counting from the least significant bit. A related operation is count trailing zeros (ctz) or number of trailing zeros (ntz), which counts the number of zero bits following the least significant one bit. There are two common variants of find first set, the POSIX definition which starts indexing of bits at 1, herein labelled ffs, and the variant which starts indexing of bits at zero, which is equivalent to ctz.

The operation which finds the index of the most significant set bit is log base 2, so called because it computes the binary logarithm ⌊log_{2}(x)⌋. This is closely related to count leading zeros (clz) or number of leading zeros (nlz), which counts the number of zero bits preceding the most significant one bit. (Note: These four operations also have (much less common) negated versions: find first zero (ffz), which identifies the index of the least significant zero bit; count trailing ones, which counts the number of one bits following the least significant zero bit.; count leading ones, which counts the number of one bits preceding the most significant zero bit; find the index of the most significant zero bit, which is an inverted version of the binary logarithm.)

Most modern CPU instruction set architectures provide one or more of these as hardware operators; software emulation is usually provided for the others, either as compiler intrinsics or in system libraries.

== Examples ==
Given the following 32-bit word:

00000000000000001000000000001000

The count trailing zeros operation would return 3, while the count leading zeros operation would return 16. The count leading zeros operation depends on the word size: if this 32-bit word were truncated to a 16-bit word, count leading zeros would return zero. The find first set operation would return 4, indicating the 4th position from the right. The logarithm of this number is log_{2} 32776 = 15.000352, so the truncated base-2 logarithm is 15.

Similarly, given the bitwise negation of the above word:

11111111111111110111111111110111

The count trailing ones operation would return 3, the count leading ones operation would return 16, and the find first zero operation ffz would return 4.

If the word is zero (no bits set), count leading zeros and count trailing zeros both return the number of bits in the word, while ffs returns zero. Both log base 2 and zero-based implementations of find first set generally return an undefined result for the zero word.

== Hardware support ==
Many instruction set architectures include find first set or related operations. The most common operation is count leading zeros (clz); other operations can be implemented efficiently in terms of it (see Properties and relations).

Platform	Mnemonic	Name	Operand widths	Description	On application to 0
ARM (ARMv5T architecture and later) except Cortex-M0/M0+/M1/M23	clz	Count Leading Zeros	32	clz	32
ARM (ARMv8-A architecture)	clz	Count Leading Zeros	32, 64	clz	Operand width
AVR32	clz	Count Leading Zeros	32	clz	32
DEC Alpha	ctlz	Count Leading Zeros	64	clz	64
DEC Alpha	cttz	Count Trailing Zeros	64	ctz	64
Intel 80386 and later	bsf	Bit Scan Forward	16, 32, 64	ctz	Undefined; sets zero flag
Intel 80386 and later	bsr	Bit Scan Reverse	16, 32, 64	Log base 2	Undefined; sets zero flag
x86 supporting BMI1 or ABM	lzcnt	Count Leading Zeros	16, 32, 64	clz	Operand width; sets carry flag
x86 supporting BMI1	tzcnt	Count Trailing Zeros	16, 32, 64	ctz	Operand width; sets carry flag
Itanium	clz	Count Leading Zeros	64	clz	64
MIPS32/MIPS64	clz	Count Leading Zeros in Word	32, 64	clz	Operand width
MIPS32/MIPS64	clo	Count Leading Ones in Word	32, 64	clo	Operand width
Motorola 68020 and later	bfffo	Find First One in Bit Field	Arbitrary	Log base 2	Field offset + field width
PDP-10	jffo	Jump if Find First One	36	clz	0; no operation (i.e., jumps on nonzero)
POWER/PowerPC/Power ISA	cntlz/cntlzw/cntlzd	Count Leading Zeros	32, 64	clz	Operand width
Power ISA 3.0 and later	cnttzw/cnttzd	Count Trailing Zeros	32, 64	ctz	Operand width
RISC-V ("B" Extension)	clz	Count Leading Zeros	32, 64	clz	Operand width
RISC-V ("B" Extension)	ctz	Count Trailing Zeros	32, 64	ctz	Operand width
SPARC Oracle Architecture 2011 and later	lzcnt (synonym: lzd)	Leading Zero Count	64	clz	64
VAX	ffs	Find First Set	0–32	ctz	Operand width; sets zero flag
IBM z/Architecture	flogr	Find Leftmost One	64	clz	64
IBM z/Architecture	vclz	Vector Count Leading Zeroes	8, 16, 32, 64	clz	Operand width
IBM z/Architecture	vctz	Vector Count Trailing Zeroes	8, 16, 32, 64	ctz	Operand width

On some Alpha platforms CTLZ and CTTZ are emulated in software.

== Tool and library support ==
A number of compiler and library vendors supply compiler intrinsics or library functions to perform find first set and/or related operations, which are frequently implemented in terms of the hardware instructions above:

Tool/library	Name	Type	Input type(s)	Notes	On application to 0
C23 standard library	stdc_first_trailing_one[_uc,_us,_ui,_ul,_ull] stdc_trailing_zeros[_uc,_us,_ui,_ul,_ull] stdc_first_leading_one[_uc,_us,_ui,_ul,_ull] stdc_leading_zeros[_uc,_us,_ui,_ul,_ull]	Library function	unsigned char, unsigned short, unsigned int, unsigned long, unsigned long long	Functions for zero and ones are also provided.	0 (bit index); Operand width (count)
C++20 standard library	bit_ceil bit_floor bit_width countl_zero countl_one countr_zero countr_one	Library function	unsigned char, unsigned short, unsigned int, unsigned long, unsigned long long		
POSIX.1 compliant libc 4.3BSD libc OS X 10.3 libc	ffs	Library function	int	Includes glibc. POSIX does not supply the complementary log base 2 / clz.	0
FreeBSD 5.3 libc OS X 10.4 libc	ffsl fls flsl	Library function	int, long	fls("find last set") computes (log base 2) + 1.	0
FreeBSD 7.1 libc	ffsll flsll	Library function	long long		0
GCC 3.4.0; Clang 5.x	__builtin_ffs[l,ll,imax] __builtin_clz[l,ll,imax] __builtin_ctz[l,ll,imax]	Built-in functions	unsigned int, unsigned long, unsigned long long, uintmax_t	GCC documentation considers result undefined clz and ctz on 0.	0 (ffs)
Visual Studio 2005	_BitScanForward _BitScanReverse	Compiler intrinsics	unsigned long, unsigned __int64	Separate return value to indicate zero input	Undefined
Visual Studio 2008	__lzcnt	Compiler intrinsic	unsigned short, unsigned int, unsigned __int64	Relies on hardware support for the lzcnt instruction introduced in BMI1 or ABM.	Operand width
Visual Studio 2012	_arm_clz	Compiler intrinsic	unsigned int	Relies on hardware support for the clz instruction introduced in the ARMv5T architecture and later.	?
Intel C++ Compiler	_bit_scan_forward _bit_scan_reverse	Compiler intrinsics	int		Undefined
Nvidia CUDA	__clz	Functions	32-bit, 64-bit	Compiles to fewer instructions on the GeForce 400 series	32
Nvidia CUDA	__ffs	Functions	32-bit, 64-bit	Compiles to fewer instructions on the GeForce 400 series	0
LLVM	llvm.ctlz.* llvm.cttz.*	Intrinsic	8, 16, 32, 64, 256	LLVM assembly language	Operand width, if 2nd argument is 0; undefined otherwise
GHC 7.10 (base 4.8), in Data.Bits	countLeadingZeros countTrailingZeros	Library function	FiniteBits b => b	Haskell programming language	Operand width
Rust standard library	highest_one leading_zeros lowest_one trailing_zeros	Library method	All primitive integer types and other integer types such as NonZero<T>	highest_one and lowest_one are not yet stable.	
Zig	@clz @ctz	builtin function	integer or vector		

== Properties and relations ==
If bits are labeled starting at 1 (which is the convention used in this article), then count trailing zeros and find first set operations are related by ctz(x) = ffs(x) − 1 (except when the input is zero). If bits are labeled starting at 0, then count trailing zeros and find first set are exactly equivalent operations. Given w bits per word, the log_{2} is easily computed from the clz and vice versa by log_{2}(x) = w − 1 − clz(x).

As demonstrated in the example above, the find first zero, count leading ones, and count trailing ones operations can be implemented by negating the input and using find first set, count leading zeros, and count trailing zeros. The reverse is also true.

On platforms with an efficient log_{2} operation such as M68000, ctz can be computed by:

ctz(x) = log_{2}(x & −x)

where & denotes bitwise AND and −x denotes the two's complement of x. The expression x & −x clears all but the least-significant 1 bit, so that the most- and least-significant 1 bit are the same.

On platforms with an efficient count leading zeros operation such as ARM and PowerPC, ffs can be computed by:

ffs(x) = w − clz(x & −x).

Conversely, on machines without log_{2} or clz operators, clz can be computed using ctz, albeit inefficiently:

clz = w − ctz(2^{⌈log_{2}(x)⌉}) (which depends on ctz returning w for the zero input)

On platforms with an efficient Hamming weight (population count) operation such as SPARC's POPC or Blackfin's ONES, there is:

ctz(x) = popcount((x & −x) − 1), or ctz(x) = popcount(~(x | −x)),
ffs(x) = popcount(x ^ ~−x)
clz = 32 − popcount(2^{⌈log_{2}(x)⌉} − 1)

where ^ denotes bitwise exclusive-OR, | denotes bitwise OR and ~ denotes bitwise negation.

The inverse problem (given i, produce an x such that ctz(x) = i) can be computed with a left-shift (1 << i).

Find first set and related operations can be extended to arbitrarily large bit arrays in a straightforward manner by starting at one end and proceeding until a word that is not all-zero (for ffs, ctz, clz) or not all-one (for ffz, clo, cto) is encountered. A tree data structure that recursively uses bitmaps to track which words are nonzero can accelerate this.

== Software emulation ==
Most CPUs dating from the late 1980s onward have bit operators for ffs or equivalent, but a few modern ones like some of the ARM Cortex-M processors do not. In lieu of hardware operators for ffs, clz and ctz, software can emulate them with shifts, integer arithmetic and bitwise operators. There are several approaches depending on architecture of the CPU and to a lesser extent, the programming language semantics and compiler code generation quality. The approaches may be loosely described as linear search, binary search, search+table lookup, de Bruijn multiplication, floating point conversion/exponent extract, and bit operator (branchless) methods. There are tradeoffs between execution time and storage space as well as portability and efficiency.

Software emulations are usually deterministic. They return a defined result for all input values; in particular, the result for an input of all zero bits is usually 0 for ffs, and the bit length of the operand for the other operations.

If one has a hardware clz or equivalent, ctz can be efficiently computed with bit operations, but the converse is not true: clz is not efficient to compute in the absence of a hardware operator.

=== 2^{n} ===
The function 2^{⌈log_{2}(x)⌉} (round up to the nearest power of two) using shifts and bitwise ORs is not efficient to compute as in this 32-bit example and even more inefficient if we have a 64-bit or 128-bit operand:

function pow2(x):
    if x = 0 return invalid  // invalid is implementation defined (not in [0,63])
    x ← x - 1
    for each y in {1, 2, 4, 8, 16}: x ← x | (x >> y)
    return x + 1

=== FFS ===
Since ffs = ctz + 1 (POSIX) or ffs = ctz (other implementations), the applicable algorithms for ctz may be used, with a possible final step of adding 1 to the result, and returning 0 instead of the operand length for input of all zero bits.

=== CTZ ===
The canonical algorithm is a loop counting zeros starting at the LSB until a 1-bit is encountered:

function ctz1 (x)
    if x = 0 return w
    t ← 1
    r ← 0
    while (x & t) = 0
        t ← t << 1
        r ← r + 1
    return r

This algorithm executes O(w) time and operations, and is impractical in practice due to a large number of conditional branches.

An exception is if the inputs are uniformly distributed. In that case, we can rely on the fact that half the return values will be 0, one quarter will be 1, and so on. The average number of loop iterations per function call is 1, and the algorithm executes in O(1) average-case time.

A lookup table can eliminate most branches:

table[1..2n-1] = ctz(i) for i in 1..2n-1
function ctz2 (x)
    if x = 0 return w
    r ← 0
    while (x & (2n−1)) ≠ 0
        x ← x >> n
        r ← r + n
    return r + table[x & (2n−1)]

The parameter n is fixed (typically 8) and represents a time–space tradeoff. The loop may also be fully unrolled. But as a linear lookup, this approach is still O(n) in the number of bits in the operand.

If n = 4 is chosen, the table of 16 2-bit entries can be encoded in a single 32-bit constant using SIMD within a register techniques:

// binary 000100100001001100010010000100xx
table ← 0x12131210
function ctz2a (x)
    if x = 0 return w
    r ← 0
    while (x & 15) = 0
        x ← x >> 4
        r ← r + 4
    return r + ((table >> 2*(x & 15)) & 3);

This technique is quite practical in applications such as the binary GCD algorithm, where the x values are uniformly distributed, so the iterative loop is not needed 15/16 of the time, and suffers minimal branch misprediction penalty.

A binary search implementation takes a logarithmic number of operations and branches, as in this 32-bit version:

function ctz3 (x)
    if x = 0 return 32
    n ← 0
    if (x & 0x0000FFFF) = 0: n ← n + 16, x ← x >> 16
    if (x & 0x000000FF) = 0: n ← n +  8, x ← x >>  8
    if (x & 0x0000000F) = 0: n ← n +  4, x ← x >>  4
    if (x & 0x00000003) = 0: n ← n +  2, x ← x >>  2
    if (x & 0x00000001) = 0: n ← n +  1
    // Equivalently, n ← n + 1 - (x & 1)
    return n

This algorithm can be assisted by a table as well, replacing the last 2 or 3 if statements with a 16- or 256-entry lookup table using the least significant bits of x as an index.

As mentioned in § Properties and relations, if the hardware has a clz operator, the most efficient approach to computing ctz is thus:

function ctz4 (x)
    if x = 0 return w
    // Isolates the LSB
    x ← x & −x
    return w − 1 − clz(x)

A similar technique can take advantage of a population count instruction:

function ctz4a (x)
    if x = 0 return w
    // Makes a mask of the least-significant bits
    x ← x ^ (x − 1)
    return popcount(x) − 1

An algorithm for 32-bit ctz uses a de Bruijn sequence to construct a minimal perfect hash function that eliminates all branches. This algorithm assumes that the result of the multiplication is truncated to 32 bit.

for i from 0 to 31: table[ 0x077CB531 << i >> 27 & 31 ] ← i  // table [0..31] initialized
function ctz5 (x)
    if x = 0 return 32
    return table[((x & −x) * 0x077CB531) >> 27 & 31]

The expression (x & −x) again isolates the least-significant 1 bit. There are then only 32 possible words, which the unsigned multiplication and shift hash to the correct position in the table. This algorithm is branch-free if it does not need to handle the zero input.

The technique can be extended to 64-bit words.

A minor variant uses the expression (x & (x−1)) to compute a mask of n trailing ones, as in the popcount method, and a different minimal perfect hash multiplier. This allows the lookup table to be shared with a count leading zeros implementation.

This also permits a folded implementation using a half-width multiply. After computing the mask, the bitwise xor of the top and bottom halves is sufficient to uniquely identify the original mask. A suitable multiplier produces a minimal perfect hash which may be decoded by a lookup table:

for i from 0 to 31: table[ ((0xffff0000 >> i) * 0x70a7) >> 11 & 31 ] ← 31 - i  // table [0..31] initialized
function ctz5 (x)
    if x = 0 return 32
    x ← x ^ (x - 1)
    x ← x ^ (x >> 16)
    return table[(x * 0x70a7) >> 11 & 31] // 0x70d3 also works

This is advantageous if the narrower multiply saves more time than the folding step adds. The technique can also be extended to 64-bit words, using the 32-bit multipliers 0x783a9b23, 0x78291d9b, 0x782c8d4f, or 0x78291acf.

=== CLZ ===
The canonical algorithm examines one bit at a time starting from the MSB until a non-zero bit is found, as shown in this example. It executes in O(n) time where n is the bit-length of the operand, and is not a practical algorithm for general use.

function clz1 (x)
    if x = 0 return w
    t ← 1 << (w - 1)
    r ← 0
    while (x & t) = 0
        t ← t >> 1
        r ← r + 1
    return r

An improvement on the previous looping approach examines eight bits at a time then uses a 256 (2^{8}) entry lookup table for the first non-zero byte. This approach, however, is still O(n) in execution time.

function clz2 (x)
    if x = 0 return w
    t ← 0xff << (w - 8)
    r ← 0
    while (x & t) = 0
        t ← t >> 8
        r ← r + 8
    return r + table[x >> (w - 8 - r)]

Binary search can reduce execution time to O(log_{2}n):

function clz3 (x)
    if x = 0 return 32
    n ← 0
    if (x & 0xFFFF0000) = 0: n ← n + 16, x ← x << 16
    if (x & 0xFF000000) = 0: n ← n +  8, x ← x <<  8
    if (x & 0xF0000000) = 0: n ← n +  4, x ← x <<  4
    if (x & 0xC0000000) = 0: n ← n +  2, x ← x <<  2
    if (x & 0x80000000) = 0: n ← n +  1
    return n

The fastest portable approaches to simulate clz are a combination of binary search and table lookup: an 8-bit table lookup (2^{8}=256 1-byte entries) can replace the bottom 3 branches in binary search. 64-bit operands require an additional branch. A larger width lookup can be used but the maximum practical table size is limited by the size of L1 data cache on modern processors. Saving a branch is more than offset by the latency of an L1 cache miss.

An algorithm similar to de Bruijn multiplication for CTZ works for CLZ, but rather than isolating the most-significant bit, it rounds up to the nearest integer of the form 2^{n}−1 using shifts and bitwise ORs:

table[0..31] = {0, 9, 1, 10, 13, 21, 2, 29, 11, 14, 16, 18, 22, 25, 3, 30,
                8, 12, 20, 28, 15, 17, 24, 7, 19, 27, 23, 6, 26, 5, 4, 31}
function clz4 (x)
    for each y in {1, 2, 4, 8, 16}: x ← x | (x >> y)
    return table[((x * 0x07C4ACDD) >> 27) % 32]

For processors with deep pipelines, like Prescott and later Intel processors, it may be faster to replace branches by bitwise AND and OR operators (even though many more instructions are required) to avoid pipeline flushes for mispredicted branches (and these types of branches are inherently unpredictable):

function clz5 (x)
    r = (x > 0xFFFF) << 4; x >>= r;
    q = (x > 0xFF  ) << 3; x >>= q; r |= q;
    q = (x > 0xF   ) << 2; x >>= q; r |= q;
    q = (x > 0x3   ) << 1; x >>= q; r |= q;
                                    r |= (x >> 1);
    return r;

On platforms that provide hardware conversion of integers to floating point, the exponent field can be extracted and subtracted from a constant to compute the count of leading zeros. Corrections are needed to account for rounding errors. Floating point conversion can have substantial latency. This method is highly non-portable and not usually recommended.

int x; 
int r;
union { unsigned int u[2]; double d; } t;

t.u[LE] = 0x43300000;  // LE is 1 for little-endian
t.u[!LE] = x;
t.d -= 4503599627370496.0;
r = (t.u[LE] >> 20) - 0x3FF;  // log2
r++;  // CLZ

== Applications ==
The count leading zeros (clz) operation can be used to efficiently implement normalization, which encodes an integer as m × 2^{e}, where m has its most significant bit in a known position (such as the highest position). This can in turn be used to implement Newton–Raphson division, perform integer to floating point conversion in software, and other applications.

Count leading zeros (clz) can be used to compute the 32-bit predicate "x = y" (zero if true, one if false) via the identity clz(x − y) >> 5, where ">>" is unsigned right shift. It can be used to perform more sophisticated bit operations like finding the first string of n 1 bits. The expression 1 << (16 − clz(x − 1)/2) is an effective initial guess for computing the square root of a 32-bit integer using Newton's method. CLZ can efficiently implement null suppression, a fast data compression technique that encodes an integer as the number of leading zero bytes together with the nonzero bytes. It can also efficiently generate exponentially distributed integers by taking the clz of uniformly random integers.

The log base 2 can be used to anticipate whether a multiplication will overflow, since ⌈log_{2}(xy)⌉ ≤ ⌈log_{2}(x)⌉ + ⌈log_{2}(y)⌉.

Count leading zeros and count trailing zeros can be used together to implement Gosper's loop-detection algorithm, which can find the period of a function of finite range using limited resources.

The binary GCD algorithm spends many cycles removing trailing zeros; this can be replaced by a count trailing zeros (ctz) followed by a shift. A similar loop appears in computations of the hailstone sequence.

A bit array can be used to implement a priority queue. In this context, find first set (ffs) is useful in implementing the "pop" or "pull highest priority element" operation efficiently. The Linux kernel real-time scheduler internally uses sched_find_first_bit() for this purpose.

The count trailing zeros operation gives a simple optimal solution to the Tower of Hanoi problem: the disks are numbered from zero, and at move k, disk number ctz(k) is moved the minimum possible distance to the right (circling back around to the left as needed). It can also generate a Gray code by taking an arbitrary word and flipping bit ctz(k) at step k.

== See also ==
- Bit Manipulation Instruction Sets – Type of computer instructions
- Trailing zero
- Leading zero
- Trailing digit
- Leading digit
- Bit-length
