= Memory address =

Reference to a specific memory location

In a computer using virtual memory, accessing the location corresponding to a memory address may involve many levels.

In computing, a memory address is a reference to a specific memory location in memory used by both software and hardware. These addresses are fixed-length sequences of digits, typically displayed and handled as unsigned integers. This numerical representation is based on the features of the CPU (such as the instruction pointer and incremental address registers). Programming language constructs often treat the memory like an array.

== Types ==
=== Physical addresses ===
A digital computer's main memory consists of many memory locations, each identified by a unique physical address (a specific code). The CPU or other devices can use these addresses to access the corresponding memory locations. Generally, only system software (such as the BIOS, operating systems, and specialized utility programs like memory testers) directly addresses physical memory using machine code instructions or processor registers. These instructions tell the CPU to interact with a hardware component called the memory controller. The memory controller manages access to memory using the memory bus or a system bus, or through separate control, address, and data buses, to execute the program's instructions. The bus managed by the memory controller consists of multiple parallel lines, each representing a binary digit (bit).

=== Logical addresses ===
A computer program uses memory addresses to execute machine code, and to store and retrieve data. In early computers, logical addresses (used by programs) and physical addresses (actual locations in hardware memory) were the same. However, with the introduction of virtual memory, most application programs do not deal directly with physical addresses. Instead, they use logical or virtual addresses, which are translated to physical addresses by the computer's memory management unit (MMU) and the operating system's memory mapping mechanisms.

== Unit of address resolution ==
Most modern computers are byte-addressable. Each address identifies a single 8-bit byte (octet) of storage. Data larger than a single byte may be stored in a sequence of consecutive addresses. There exist word-addressable computers, where the minimal addressable storage unit is exactly the processor's word. (Note: Some word-addressable computers have byte-handling instructions, typically supporing byte sizes up to a word but not supporting bytes that straddled words. For example, the DEC PDP-6 and PDP-10 have: Deposit Byte (DPB); Increment Byte Pointer (IBP); Increment and Deposit Byte (IDPB); Increment and Load Byte (ILDB); Load Byte (LDB)) For example, the Data General Nova and HP 2100 minicomputer families, and the National Semiconductor IMP-16 microcomputer, used 16-bit words, and there are many old mainframe computers that use 36-bit word addressing (such as the IBM 7090, with 15-bit word addresses, giving an address space of 2^{15} 36-bit words, approximately 128 kilobytes of storage, and the DEC PDP-6/PDP-10, with 18-bit word addresses, giving an address space of 2^{18} 36-bit words, approximately 1 megabyte of storage), not byte addressing. The range of addressing of memory depends on the bit size of the bus used for addresses – the more bits used, the more addresses are available to the computer. For example, an 8-bit-byte-addressable machine with a 20-bit address bus (e.g. Intel 8086) can address 2^{20} (1,048,576) memory locations, or one MiB of memory, while a 32-bit bus (e.g. Intel 80386) addresses 2^{32} (4,294,967,296) locations, or a 4 GiB address space. In contrast, a 36-bit word-addressable machine with an 18-bit address bus addresses only 2^{18} (262,144) 36-bit locations (9,437,184 bits), equivalent to 1,179,648 8-bit bytes, or 1152 KiB, or 1.125 MiB — slightly more than the 8086.

A small number of older machines are bit-addressable. For example, a variable filed length (VFL) instruction on the IBM 7030 "Stretch" specifies a bit address, a byte size of 1 to 8 and a field length.

Some older computers (decimal computers) are decimal digit-addressable. For example, each address in the IBM 1620's magnetic-core memory identified a single six bit binary-coded decimal digit, consisting of a parity bit, flag bit and four numerical bits. The 1620 used 5-digit decimal addresses, so in theory the highest possible address was 99,999. In practice, the CPU supported 20,000 memory locations, and up to two optional external memory units could be added, each supporting 20,000 addresses, for a total of 60,000 (00000–59999).

Some older computers are character-addressable, with 6-bit BCD characters containing a 2-bit zone and a 4-bit digit; the characters in an address only have digit values representing 0–9. Typically some of the zone bits are part of the address and some are used for other purposes, e.g., index register, indirect address.

Some older computers are decimal-word addressable, typically with 4-digit addresses. In some machines the address fields also select index registers, restricting the range of possible address.

=== Word size versus address size ===
Word size is a characteristic of a computer architecture denoting the number of bits that a CPU can process at one time. Modern processors, including embedded systems, usually have a word size of 8, 16, 24, 32 or 64 bits; most current general-purpose computers use 32 or 64 bits. Many different sizes have been used historically, including 8, 9, 10, 12, 18, 24, 36, 39, 40, 48 and 60 bits.

Very often, when referring to the word size of a modern computer, one is also describing the size of address space on that computer. For instance, a computer said to be "32-bit" also usually allows 32-bit memory addresses; a byte-addressable 32-bit computer can address 2^{32} = 4,294,967,296 bytes of memory, or 4 gibibytes (GiB). This allows one memory address to be efficiently stored in one word.

However, this does not always hold true. Computers can have memory addresses larger or smaller than their word size. For instance, many 8-bit processors, such as the MOS Technology 6502, supported 16-bit addresses— if not, they would have been limited to a mere 256 bytes of memory addressing. The 16-bit Intel 8088 and Intel 8086 supported 20-bit addressing via segmentation, allowing them to access 1 MiB rather than 64 KiB of memory. All Intel Pentium processors since the Pentium Pro include Physical Address Extensions (PAE) which support mapping 36-bit physical addresses to 32-bit virtual addresses. Many early LISP implementations on, e.g., 36-bit processors, held 2 addresses per word as the result of a cons. Some early processors held 2 and even 3 addresses per instruction word.

In theory, modern byte-addressable 64-bit computers can address 2^{64} bytes (16 exbibytes), but in practice the amount of memory is limited by the CPU, the memory controller, or the printed circuit board design (e.g., number of physical memory connectors or amount of soldered-on memory).

== Contents of each memory location ==
Each memory location in a stored-program computer holds a binary number or decimal number of some sort. Its interpretation, as data of some data type or as an instruction, and use are determined by the instructions which retrieve and manipulate it.

Some early programmers combined instructions and data in words as a way to save memory, when it was expensive: The Manchester Mark 1 had space in its 40-bit words to store little bits of data – its processor ignored a small section in the middle of a word – and that was often exploited as extra data storage. Self-replicating programs such as viruses treat themselves sometimes as data and sometimes as instructions. Self-modifying code is generally deprecated nowadays, as it makes testing and maintenance disproportionally difficult to the saving of a few bytes, and can also give incorrect results because of the compiler or processor's assumptions about the machine's state, but is still sometimes used deliberately, with great care.

=== Address space in application programming ===
In modern multitasking environment, an application process usually has in its address space (or spaces) chunks of memory of following types:

- Machine code, including:
  - program's own code (historically known as code segment or text segment);
  - shared libraries.
- Data, including:
  - initialized data (data segment);
  - uninitialized (but allocated) variables;
  - run-time stack;
  - heap;
  - shared memory and memory mapped files.

Some parts of address space may be not mapped at all.

Some systems have a "split" memory architecture where machine code, constants, and data are in different locations, and may have different address sizes. For example, PIC18 microcontrollers have a 21-bit program counter to address machine code and constants in Flash memory, and 12-bit address registers to address data in SRAM.

== Addressing schemes ==
A computer program can access an address given explicitly – in low-level programming this is usually called an absolute address, or sometimes a specific address, and is known as pointer data type in higher-level languages. But a program can also use relative address which specifies a location in relation to somewhere else (the base address). There are many more indirect addressing modes.

Mapping logical addresses to physical and virtual memory also adds several levels of indirection; see below.

== Memory models ==
Many programmers prefer to address memory such that there is no distinction between code space and data space (see above), as well as from physical and virtual memory (see above) — in other words, numerically identical pointers refer to exactly the same byte of RAM.

However, many early computers did not support such a flat memory model — in particular, Harvard architecture machines force program storage to be completely separate from data storage. Many modern DSPs (such as the Motorola 56000) have three separate storage areas — program storage, coefficient storage, and data storage. Some commonly used instructions fetch from all three areas simultaneously — fewer storage areas (even if there were the same total bytes of storage) would make those instructions run slower.

=== Memory models in x86 architecture ===
Early x86 processors use the segmented memory model addresses based on a combination of two numbers: a memory segment, and an offset within that segment.

Some segments are implicitly treated as code segments, dedicated for instructions, stack segments, or normal data segments. Although the usages are different, the segments do not have different memory protections reflecting this. In the flat memory model all segments (segment registers) are generally set to zero, and only offsets are variable.

=== Memory models in IBM S/360 and successors multiprocessors ===
In the 360/65 and 360/67, IBM introduced a concept known as prefixing. Prefixing is a level of address translation that applies to addresses in real mode and to addresses generated by dynamic address translation, using a unique prefix assigned to each CPU in a multiprocessor system. On the 360/65, 360/67 and every successor prior to z/Architecture, it logically swaps a 4096 byte block of storage with another block assigned to the CPU. On z/Architecture, prefixing operates on 8196-byte blocks. IBM classifies addresses on these systems as:

- Virtual addresses: addresses subject to dynamic address translation
- Real addresses: addresses generated from dynamic address translation, and addresses used by code running in real mode
- Absolute addresses: physical addresses

On the 360/65, on S/370 models without DAT and when running with translation turned off, there are only a flat real address space and a flat absolute address space.

On the 360/67, S/370 and successors through S/390, when running with translation on, addresses contain a segment number, a page number and an offset. Although early models supported both 2 KiB and 4 KiB page sizes, later models only supported 4 KiB. IBM later added instructions to move data between a primary address space and a secondary address space.

S/370-XA added 31-bit addresses, but retained the segment/page/offset hierarchy with 4 KiB pages.

ESA/370 added 16 access registers (ARs) and an AR access control mode, in which a 31-bit address was translated using the address space designated by a selected AR.

z/Architecture supports 64-bit virtual, real and absolute addresses, with multi-level page tables.

== See also ==
- Base address
- Endianness
- Flat memory model
- Low-level programming language
- Memory address register
- Memory allocation
- Memory management unit (MMU)
- Memory model (programming)
- Memory protection
- Memory segmentation
- Offset (computer science), also known as a displacement
- Page table
