= Offset (computer science) =

Distance between start of object and a specific element in it

In computer science, an offset within an array or other data structure object is an integer indicating the distance (displacement) between the beginning of the object and a given element or point, presumably within the same object. The concept of a distance is valid only if all elements of the object are of the same size (typically given in bytes or words).

For example, if A is an array of characters containing "abcdef", the fourth element containing the character 'd' has an offset of three from the start of A.

== In assembly language ==
In computer engineering and low-level programming (such as assembly language), an offset usually denotes the number of address locations added to a base address in order to get to a specific absolute address. In this (original) meaning of offset, only the basic address unit, usually the 8-bit byte, is used to specify the offset's size. In this context an offset is sometimes called a relative address.

In IBM System/360 instructions, a 12-bit offset embedded within certain instructions provided a range of between 0 and 4096 bytes. For example, within an unconditional branch instruction (X'47F0Fxxx'), the xxx 12-bit hexadecimal offset provided the byte offset from the base register (15) to branch to. An odd offset would cause a program check (unless the base register itself also contained an odd address)—since instructions had to be aligned on half-word boundaries to execute without a program or hardware interrupt.

The previous example describes an indirect way to address to a memory location in the format of segment:offset. For example, assume we want to refer to memory location 0xF867. One way this can be accomplished is by first defining a segment with beginning address 0xF000, and then defining an offset of 0x0867. Further, we are also allowed to shift the hexadecimal segment to reach the final absolute memory address. One thing to note here is that we can reach our final absolute address in many ways.

An offset is not always relative to the base address of the module, for example: If you have a class and you want to retrieve the "color" attribute of this class, the offset may be 0x0100, but this offset has to be added to the offset of the class itself, not the base address. If the class' offset is 0xFF881 and the base address is 0x0A100, then to retrieve the "color" attribute both offsets are added to the base address. 0x0A100 (base) + 0xFF881 (class) + 0x0100 (attribute). Ultimately the attribute's address will be 0x109A81.

== See also ==
- Array Index
