= D37 =

D37 or D-37 may refer to:

== Ships ==
- Brazilian destroyer Rio Grande do Norte (D37), a Mato Grosso-class destroyer of the Brazilian Navy
- HMAS Tobruk (D37), a Battle-class destroyer of the Royal Australian Navy
- HMS Dasher (D37), an Avenger-class aircraft carrier of the Royal Navy
- HMS Duncan (D37), a Type 45 destroyer of the Royal Navy
- HMS Vortigern (D37), a V-Class destroyer of the Royal Navy

== Rail transport ==
- EMD D37, a traction motor equipping the New South Wales 42 class locomotive
- PRR D37, a Pennsylvania Railroad locomotive

== other uses ==
- ASTM D37, a testing standard for cannabis
- D-37C, the computer component of the all-inertial NS-17 Missile Guidance Set
- D37D, a Minuteman III intercontinental ballistic missile flight computer
- D37 road (Croatia)
- Queen's Gambit Declined, a chess opening
- Warren Municipal Airport (Minnesota)
