= Autonetics =

American avionics manufacturer

- Founded: 1955
- Fate: Merged into Boeing
- Headquarters: Anaheim, California, U.S.
- Products: Autonetics Recomp II; D-17B flight computer; D-37C flight computer; D-37D flight computer

Autonetics was a division of North American Aviation that produced various avionics but is best known for their inertial navigation systems used in submarines and intercontinental ballistic missiles. Its 188-acre facility in Anaheim, California, with 36,000 employees, was the city's largest employer. Through a series of mergers, Autonetics is now part of Boeing.

== Origin ==
Autonetics originated in North American Aviation's Technical Research Laboratory, a small unit in the Los Angeles Division's engineering department, in 1945. In 1946, the laboratory won an Army Air Forces contract to develop a 175 to 500 mile range glide missile. The work and the lab expanded, and by June 1948, all of the Aerophysics Laboratory was consolidated at Downey, California. The evolution of the Navaho missile program then resulted in the establishment of Autonetics as a separate division of North American Aviation in 1955, first located in Downey, moving to Anaheim, California in 1963.

== Divisions ==
Autonetics included the Navigation Systems division, designing and producing inertial and stellar-inertial navigation systems for ships, submarines, missiles, aircraft and space vehicles. One of the automatic navigation systems produced by the division was the N-6 or NAVAN (North American Vehicle Auto Navigation) for the Navaho missile system, and the later AGM-28 Hound Dog. Other products included alignment devices and attitude reference systems for missile launchers, artillery, land survey, aircraft and missile-range ships.

The Electro Sensor Systems division built multi-function radar systems, armament control computers, data and information display systems for high performance aircraft, and sensor equipment. The radar systems included the R-14 and F-15, which were multimode, monopulse systems. This family of radars was termed NASARR (North American Search and Ranging Radar). The R-14 system was installed in the USAF F-105 Thunderchief and the more advanced F-15 system with Terrain Following capabilities was developed for the USAF F-104 Starfighter which were also used by NATO, MAP, and the Canadian Air Force. Both radar systems allowed Time On Target (ToT) impact control capability with a high degree of accuracy. The R-14 and F-15 systems used (pre-solid state) electronic vacuum tubes in their designs. Both systems were developed, built and tested at the Downey (Slauson Avenue), and Anaheim facilities.

The Data Systems division developed data-processing systems, general-purpose digital computers, ground support equipment, control systems and telemetry systems.

Autonetics built an office computer system (RECOMP), and was responsible for the guidance and control system for the Boeing-built Minuteman missiles. The division ultimately produced the Monica family of microcomputers, the D-17B Minuteman I computer, and the D-37B and D-37C Minuteman II computers, in which micro-miniaturization reduced weight by two-thirds. Autonetics also developed and tested flight programs for the D37D Minuteman III computer.

The 1966 Autonetics DDA integrator was the first MOS large scale array (LSA) using four-phase logic. After producing the DDA and other MOS-LSA circuits, the team involved decided to design a general purpose computer suitable for navigation (sometimes called the MOS GP computer). The Autonetics D200 computer was built using MOS LSAs.

== Milestones ==
- The first airplane flight of an inertial autonavigator (XN-1) in 1950.
- The first flight of an all-solid-state computer (for the Navaho guidance system) in 1955.
- The navigation system for the first submerged crossing of the North Pole, on board the USS Nautilus (SSN-571) in 1958.

== Products ==
- N-6 NAVAN (North American Vehicle Auto Navigation)
- Autonetics RECOMP I military computer, 1957
- Autonetics Recomp II office computer, 1958
- Autonetics RECOMP III office computer
- VERDAN (Versatile Digital Analyzer) general purpose military computer, 1959, and MARDAN (Marine Digital Analyzer; VERDAN II), part of the Ship's Inertial Navigation System (SINS), 1961
- D-17B flight computer
- D-37C flight computer
- D-37D flight computer
- Autonetics D200 flight computer
