= D37D =

Military flight computer

Minuteman III guidance ring containing the D37D computer.

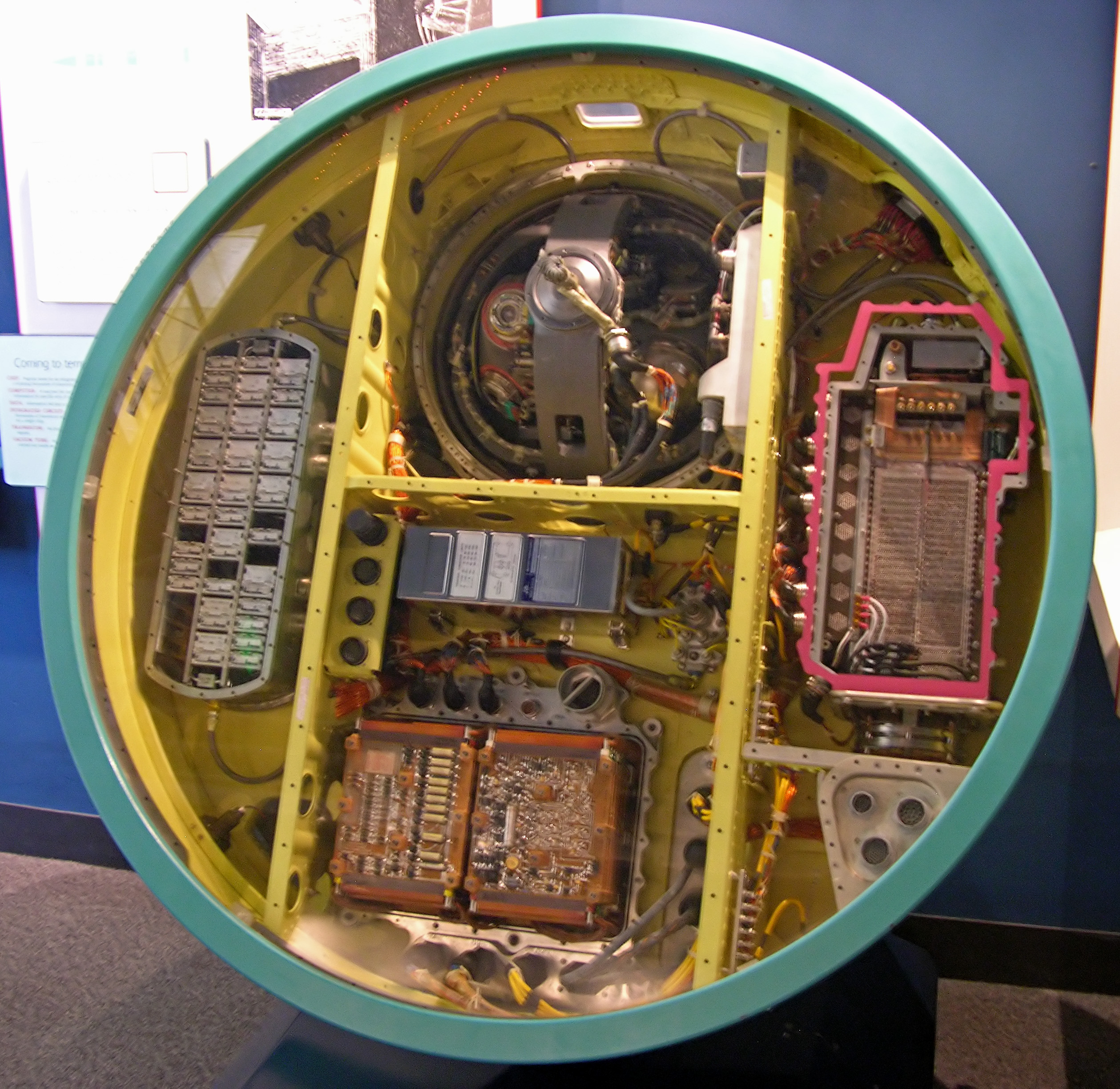
Minuteman III guidance ring on display at the National Air and Space Museum.

The D37D Minuteman III flight computer was initially supplied with the LGM-30G missile, as part of the NS-20 navigation system. The NS-20 D37D flight computer is a miniaturized general purpose (serial transmission) digital computer. The new NS-50 missile guidance computer (MGC) is built around a 16-bit high-speed microprocessor chip set. They are both designed to solve real-time positional error problems under the adverse conditions encountered in airborne weapon systems. They accept and process data and generate steering signals with sufficient accuracy and speed to meet the requirements of the inertial guidance and flight control systems of the Minuteman ICBMs.

Computer operation is controlled by an internally stored program which is loaded from a magnetic tape cartridge at the launch facility (LF). Both the D37D computer and the MGC are designed and programmed to control the Minuteman III missile throughout the powered portion of flight. After thrust termination they also control the PBV for the reentry vehicle (RV) deployment phase. In addition, they control the alignment of the inertial platform and test/monitor the guidance & control (G&C) system and other components to determine continued readiness while missiles are in alert status. The D37D computer began to be replaced by the MGC in 2000 as part of the Guidance Replacement Program (GRP), with fielding planned through 2008. The MGC incorporates the amplifier assembly functions.

When a launch is commanded, a complete retesting of the G&C system is made prior to entering the flight program. During flight, the computer uses missile attitude, change of attitude rate, and velocity signal inputs to solve a series of guidance, steering, and control equations. It also generates missile steering commands and controls staging and thrust termination. Finally, the computer determines whether or not to provide pre-arm signals to the warhead. The pre-arm decision is based on flight safety checks made during powered flight.

== Missile Guidance Set (MGS) ==
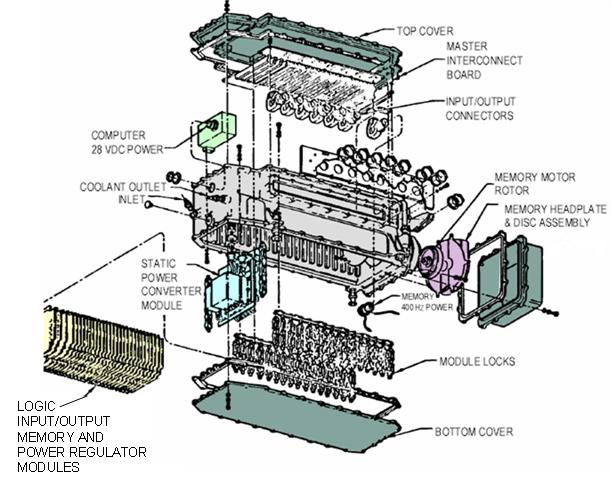
Autonetics D37D digital computer, part of the NS20 Navigation System.

The Autonetics Division of Rockwell International produced all three generations of the Minuteman Missile Guidance Set (MGS). The MGS includes the Gyro Stabilized Platform (GSP), Digital Control Unit (DCU), Missile Guidance Set Control (MGSC) and the Amplifier Assembly. The MGS is an inertial guidance system which directs the flight of the missiles. The guidance system operates while the missile is in alert status, thus enabling the missile to be launched in less than one minute.

Once the missile is launched, the guidance system cannot be changed or affected from the ground, a feature which prevents enemy interference with the planned trajectory of the missile.

During first-stage flight, the computer in the guidance and control (G&C) section sends commands to the nozzle control unit (NCU) to keep the missile on the precise course required for the reentry vehicles (RVs) to reach their designated targets. At the proper instant, the computer sends commands which separate an almost exhausted motor from the missile, and ignites the next-stage motor. The G&C section then sends steering commands to the thrust vector control (TVC) unit of each succeeding motor stage to keep the rocket on course.

The incorporation of current-technology electronics with each generation of the guidance system has resulted in a smaller, more capable, and less vulnerable system.

== See also ==
- D-17B
- D-37C
