= Autonetics RECOMP II =

1958 computer

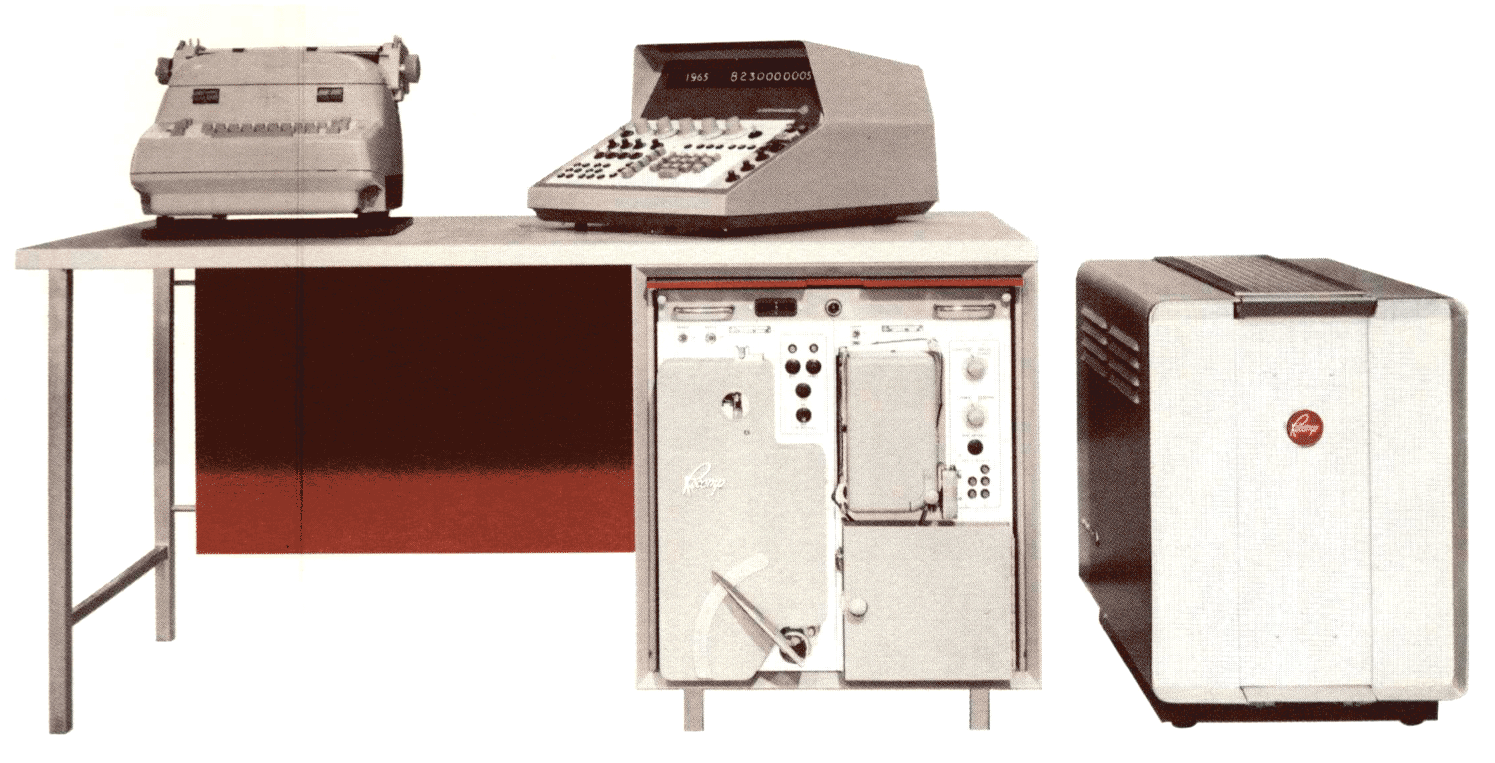
- Promotional picture of the RECOMP II from a brochure
- Developer: Autonetics
- Released: 1958
- Predecessor: Autonetics RECOMP I
- Successor: Autonetics RECOMP III

The Autonetics RECOMP II was a computer first introduced in 1958. It was made by the Autonetics division of North American Aviation.

It was attached to a desk that housed the input/output devices. Its desk integration made it a hands-on small system intended for the scientific and engineering computing market. The computer weighed about 197 pounds (89 kg) alone, and 400 pounds (180 kg) including input-output.

== Architecture ==
It had a 40-bit word size, 20-bit instruction size. Memory and registers were on a fixed head disk that operated like a drum memory—4080 words on standard tracks, 16 words on fast loop tracks, registers A, B, R, X each on their own high-speed loop track, and one prerecorded read only clock track.

It had a complete set of built-in floating point operations, including square root. Floating-point values used two words, one for the exponent and one for the fraction for a total of 80 bits.

Whereas the full 40-bit word was used for data, instructions were only 20 bits long and were stored two per word. Since indexing was commonly done by modifying the address part of an instruction (say, by adding one to access the next data item in a list), such instructions always had to be in the second half-word, and the first half-word was padded with a NOP instruction. Programmers also used these NOP instructions to provide space for future inserted instructions, since the assembler did not allow for use of symbolic addresses, and the insertion of a single instruction could otherwise require rewriting a lot of code.

The machine had a bit-serial architecture.

Punched paper tape was the external storage medium. The desk also had an electronic typewriter for printed output and a keyboard integrated with the system console to allow typed input and system control. Programs written in machine code could be input to the system from the console.
