= Base address =

In computing, a base address is a memory address serving as a reference point ("base") for other addresses. For example, the address of the beginning of a data structure could be used as the base address for references to elements of that structure. Related addresses can be accessed using an addressing scheme.

Under the relative addressing scheme, to obtain an absolute address, the relevant base address is taken and an offset (aka displacement) is added to it. Under this type of scheme, the base address is the lowest-numbered address within a prescribed range, to facilitate adding related positive-valued offsets.

In IBM System/360 architecture, the base address is a 24-bit value in a general register (extended in steps to 64 bits in z/Architecture), and the offset is a 12-bit value in the instruction (extended to 20 bits in z/Architecture).

== See also ==
- Index register
- Rebasing
