= Rod Drury =

New Zealand businessman

Sir Rod Drury KNZM
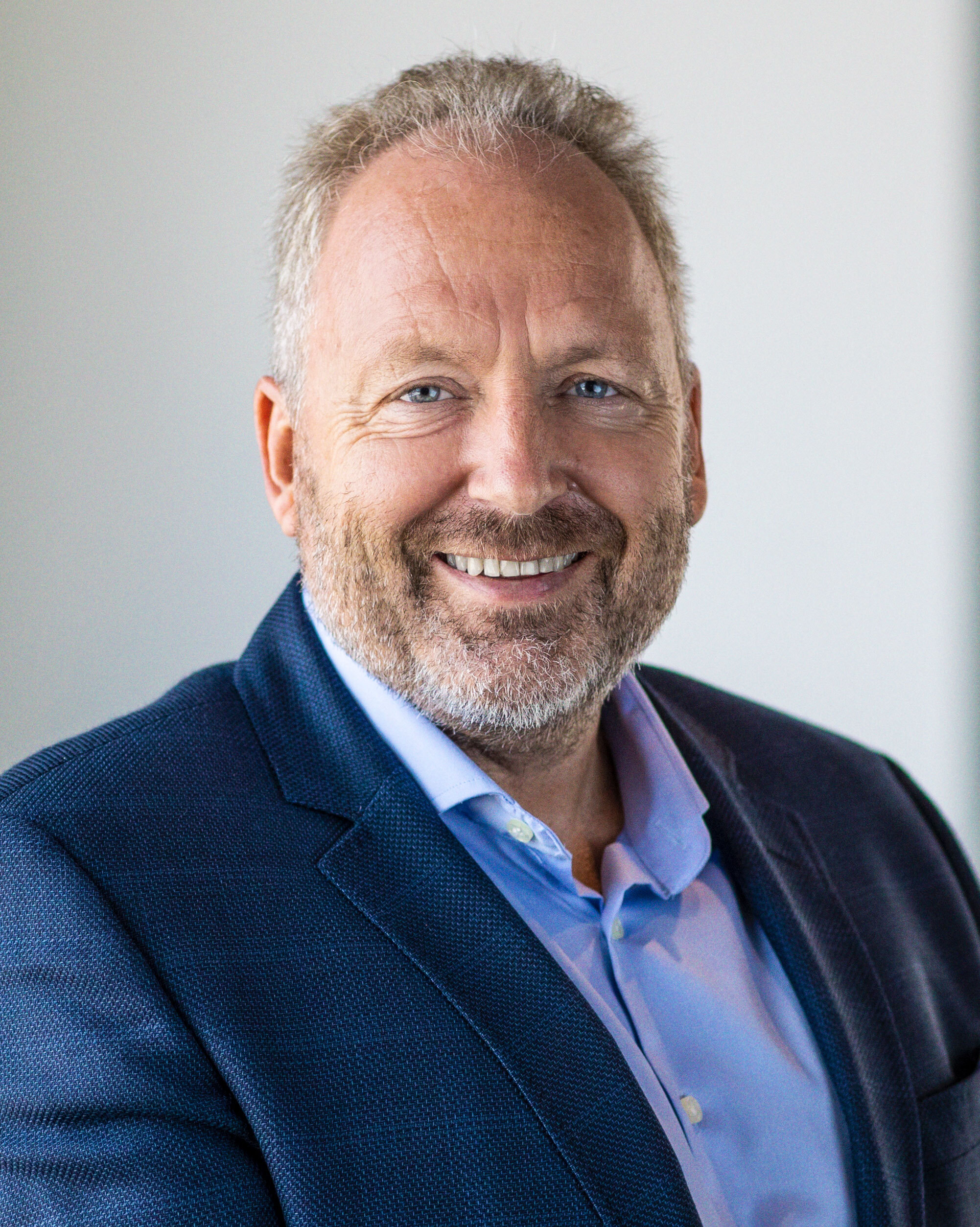
- Born: Rodney Kenneth Drury; 1966 (age 59–60); Wellington, New Zealand
- Occupation: Technology entrepreneur
- Known for: Founding Xero

Sir Rodney Kenneth Drury KNZM (born 1966) is a New Zealand technology entrepreneur, predominantly known for his association with accounting software company Xero. Drury was CEO of Xero until 2018, after founding the company in 2006.

Drury made his initial fortune through Glazier Systems, a New Zealand software development and consulting company, which was sold in 1999. He subsequently established Context Connect and an email technology company called Aftermail. He is a former director of Trade Me, and was involved in the now-defunct Pacific Fibre project.

== Early life ==
Drury is the son of a tradesman and an executive assistant and grew up in Hawke's Bay. He is reported to have Māori heritage, with his father tracing a lineage to Ngāi Tahu.

Drury attended Napier Boys' High School, which is where he says he developed an interest in computer programming, before going on to study commerce and administration at Victoria University of Wellington. After university, he worked at the accounting firm Arthur Young, which became Ernst & Young in 1989.

In his early 20s, Drury stuttered so badly that he struggled to speak on the phone. However, he was able to overcome it using a smooth speech course at about age 27. He says that overcoming his stutter was crucial to starting the Xero business.

== Career ==
In 1995, Drury established Glazier Systems, a New Zealand software development and consulting company. Glazier Systems was acquired by Advantage Group in 1999 for approximately $7.5 million, which later became Intergen. Drury subsequently co-founded Context Connect and then founded and served as CEO of AfterMail which was acquired by Quest Software (subsequently acquired by Francisco Partners and Elliott Management Corporation).

In July 2006 Drury founded Xero, a publicly listed software as a service accounting-software company, and served as its CEO.

In October 2007, Drury was a judge for the New Zealand Open Source Awards.

Drury co-founded Pacific Fibre, a company which attempted to build an internet cable between Australia, New Zealand, and the United States. The cable would have cost around $400 million but the venture was ultimately unsuccessful.

In November 2017, he sold $95 million worth of shares in Xero, leaving him with a 13 per cent holding in the company. He stated the sale would support his "future plans to pursue a range of philanthropic and social endeavours." He stepped down as CEO of Xero in March 2018, continuing on with the company as a non-executive director.

== Honours and awards ==
Drury was awarded the Hi-Tech New Zealand "Entrepreneur of the Year" award in 2006 and 2007.

In August 2008 Drury was awarded the title of Honorary Fellow of the New Zealand Computer Society (HFNZCS) during the 2008 NZ Computerworld Excellence Awards. He is only the 21st person to be awarded the title in the Society's 48-year history.

In 2012, Drury was named NZ Herald Business Leader of the Year, and the following year he was named Ernst and Young Entrepreneur of the Year.

In 2025, Drury was inducted into the New Zealand Business Hall of Fame, in recognition of his contributions to technology.

In the 2026 New Year Honours, Drury was appointed a Knight Companion of the New Zealand Order of Merit, for services to business, the technology industry and philanthropy.

In March 2026, Drury was named as Kiwibank's 2026 New Zealander of the Year, but he returned the award after being publicly accused of sexual misconduct by three former employees.

== Misconduct allegations ==
In April 2026, former junior Xero employee Ally Naylor publicly alleged misconduct by Drury during his tenure as chief executive, stating she was motivated to speak out following his receipt of the 2026 New Zealander of the Year award. Naylor subsequently laid a formal complaint with New Zealand Police. Xero engaged external counsel to independently review the historical allegations and the company's handling of them at the time.

In early May 2026, two further women came forward with allegations of unwanted sexualised behaviour; a second former Xero employee identified only as "Amy", and Drury's former private chef Megan Ruddle. Drury denied the allegations made by Naylor and Ruddle; his representatives declined to comment on Amy's allegations.

On 8 May 2026, Drury returned the 2026 New Zealander of the Year award. The New Zealander of the Year Awards Office confirmed the award would not be re-awarded. In a statement, Drury said that while he "completely rejected" the recent allegations, he did not want the situation to undermine the integrity of the awards or place further pressure on the awards office while investigations and proper processes were ongoing.

== Personal life ==
Drury has three children from his first marriage. He lives in Queenstown

In 2020, Drury donated $1,000,000 to the iwi charity Mana Tahuna to clean up Queenstown's Lake Hayes.

In 2022, Drury donated $100,000 to ACT.

In 2025 Drury was ranked 22nd on the National Business Review's "NBR Rich List," with an estimated net worth of NZ$500 million.
