= Pacific Fibre =

Pacific Fibre Cable System
- Cable type: Fibre-optic
- Fate: Cancelled
- Design capacity: 512 Tbit/s per cable
- Lit capacity: 120 Gbit/s
- Built by: TE Subcom
- Landing points: Auckland; Sydney; Los Angeles
- Area served: Southern Pacific
- Owner(s): Pacific Fibre
- Website: Pacific Fibre.net

Pacific Fibre is a New Zealand-based company that proposed to build a trans-Pacific undersea communications cable that was to have competed with the Southern Cross Cable operated by Telecom New Zealand. The cable would have totalled 12,750 km (7,920 miles) in length, and the initial investment was projected to be US$350 million. Customers included Vodafone New Zealand, Australian ISP iiNet, and the Kiwi Advanced Research and Education Network in New Zealand.

== Routes ==
- Auckland <=> Sydney
- Auckland <=> Los Angeles

== Pacific Fibre cable history ==
In July 2011, Pacific Fibre selected TE SubCom, a TE Connectivity company, to deploy the cable.

Marine route surveys began after permitting studies for California and Australia were completed in March 2012.

In April 2012, a US customer agreed to purchase connectivity services. Fundraising for the project was scheduled to complete in June 2012.

On August 1, Pacific Fibre announced they were unable to secure sufficient investment and the planned cable was discontinued. "I think it's tragic news for the New Zealand market," said Telecommunications Users Association CEO Paul Brislen. "We've spent millions of shareholder funds trying to get this done and despite getting some good investor support we have not been able to find the level of investment required in New Zealand initially and more broadly offshore," said Pacific Fibre chairman Sam Morgan. Pacific Fibre subsequently ceased operations.

In November 2012, German entrepreneur Kim Dotcom announced his intention to revive the Pacific Fibre broadband cable project. The plan to lay a 12,950 km cable between Auckland, Sydney and Los Angeles was abandoned in August when its backers couldn't raise the NZ$400 million they needed. Dotcom said his new Mega company would require more bandwidth than the current Southern Cross Cable can provide, but would allow him to provide "free broadband for all Kiwis".

The announcement was welcomed by technology commentators in New Zealand, but some suggested the United States' allegations over alleged internet piracy could scupper any proposal.

== Notable people ==
- Mark Rushworth, CEO
- Lance Wiggs
- Sam Morgan, TradeMe founder and senior adviser
- Michael Boustridge
- Rod Drury, managing director of Xero and senior adviser
- David Kirk, board member of the Hoyts Group
- Stephen Tindall, founder of The Warehouse
- Peter Thiel, founder of PayPal and major investor (via his New Zealand investment vehicle, Valar Ventures).

== See also ==
- Internet in New Zealand
- Hawaiki Cable
