= Copyright Act 1994 =

Act of Parliament in New Zealand

New Zealand Parliament
- Long title: An Act to consolidate and amend the law relating to copyright
- Royal assent: 15 December 1994
- Commenced: 1 January 1995

Amended by
- Copyright Amendment Act 1997 Copyright (Removal of Prohibition on Parallel Importing) Amendment Act 1998; Copyright Amendment Act 1999; Copyright (Parallel Importation of Films and Onus of Proof) Amendment Act 2003; Copyright Amendment Act 2005 Copyright (New Technologies) Amendment Act 2008
- Status: Current legislation

The Copyright Act 1994 is an Act of Parliament passed in New Zealand that, along with its various amendments, governs copyright in New Zealand. It is administered by Intellectual Property Policy Unit of the Ministry of Business, Innovation and Employment.

== Scope of copyright ==
Copyright law grants the owner of the copyright exclusive rights to certain restricted acts, which include the following.

- copying the work
- publishing, issuing or selling copies to the public
- performing, playing or showing the work in public
- broadcasting the work
- making any work derived or adapted from the copyright work.

== Copyright works ==
Copyright automatically applies (no registration required) to original works in the following categories.

- Literary works (novels, poems, song lyrics, computer programmes, compilations of data)
- Dramatic works (scripts for films or plays)
- Artistic works (paintings, plans, maps, photographs, sculptures, models, buildings)
- Musical works (scores and arrangements)
- Sound recordings (of musical, literary or dramatic works)
- Films
- Broadcasts (radio, TV, cable)
- Typographical arrangement of published editions (this exists independent of copyright in the published work, if any).

Copyright does not apply to certain government works, such as Acts of Parliament, Regulations, Parliamentary debates, Court judgements and reports of Select Committees, Royal Commissions, Commissions of Inquiry, etc.

== Copyright term ==
The copyright term is largely consistent with other countries, although it has not increased from 50 to 70 years as in Europe and the United States, and varies with the category of the work.

- Literary, dramatic, musical and artistic works; 50 years from the death of the author
- Artistic works industrially applied; 16 years from when the work is applied
- Artistic craftsmanship industrially applied; 25 years from when the work is applied
- Sound recordings and films; 50 years from when it is available to the public
- Broadcasts and cable; 50 years from broadcast
- Typographical arrangements; 25 years from first publishing.
- Computer-generated works; 50 years after being made.
- Crown copyright: 100 years

== Exclusions and fair dealing ==
The Act allows for certain permitted acts to be exempted from copyright restrictions.

- Fair dealing; for purpose of criticism, review, news reporting, research, private study.
- certain educational purposes
- time shifting of TV programmes for viewing at a later time
- format shifting of music
- back up of computer programmes
- making copies in Braille.

== Moral rights ==
The copyright act also provides moral rights for the author. These attach to the author, and are not transferred by contract as economic rights can be. Moral rights give the author the right;

- to be identified as the author (right of attribution)
- to object to derogatory treatment of the work (right of integrity)
- to not have work falsely attributed to them.

== New technologies amendments ==
In 2001, the MED initiated a major review of copyright law, in light of new technologies, such as media in digital form and communications via the internet.

Law changes were enacted in 2008, most notably the Copyright (New Technologies) Amendment Act. These changes were influenced by media corporations and aligned organisations (RIANZ, APRA, Artists Alliance, NZSA, AIPA, NZIPP, etc.) but opposed by New Zealand artists, technology specialists, ISPs, businesses, media commentators, librarians and members of the public. The nature of the law changes attracted attention internationally.

The New Zealand Prime Minister, John Key, stated that the stronger copyright laws, including the controversial section 92a, were required for New Zealand to be able to negotiate a free trade agreement with America.

In February 2010, a Bill repealing s92a was introduced to parliament, replacing it with a three notice regime for copyright infringement via file sharing. The bill also provides for the Copyright Tribunal to hear complaints and award penalties of up to $15,000. The notice regime took effect on 1 September 2011.

== See also ==
- List of countries' copyright length
- Anti-Counterfeiting Trade Agreement
- New Zealand Internet Blackout
