= Lixtor =

New Zealand internet auction website

- Type: Privately held company
- Industry: Internet-auction
- Founded: 2005
- Headquarters: Birkenhead, Auckland, NZ
- Revenue: Not Available (2008)
- Number of employees: less than 10
- Website: http://www.lixtor.co.nz/

Lixtor is an internet auction website operating in New Zealand since 2005, as a free alternative to Trade Me or Facebook Marketplace.

Lixtor's business model is substantially different from its rival site Trade Me as it tries to operate its business on advertising revenue rather than charging users on listing fees and success fee.

== Controversy ==
On 6 November 2008, the National Business Review reported on an article that Lixtor has been legally-threatened by Trade Me over "copyright infringement" on their "Privacy Policy" and "Terms and Conditions". However, Lixtor stated that it was carried out by Trade Me to "intimidate" Lixtor because Trade Me was threatened by Lixtor's "no fee" business model.

Following this dispute with Trade Me, Lixtor listed their auction site for sale on Trade Me on 17 November 2008, with the starting bid $100,000,000. The listing was listed with the option to support Plunket by rounding up the success fee. However the auction was disabled by the Trade Me administrators hours after the auction.

Nonetheless, Lixtor re-listed the auction minutes after their listing was disabled by Trade Me moderators, but this second listing was also removed hours later. No more listings were reported after this, possibly due to Trade Me's policy to suspend the "suspicious" members.

On 20 November 2008, a community newspaper The Aucklander also reported that Trade Me's lawyers asked Lixtor to remove their "Terms and Conditions".

On 3 February 2009, in the wake of the emerging New Zealand copyright law Section 92a, New Zealand Creative Freedom Foundation published an article which stated that Lixtor vs. Trade Me case is a good example of how the new section 92a in the New Zealand copyright law could be "misused", if passed.

== See also ==
- Internet in New Zealand
