= Bronwyn Holloway-Smith =

New Zealand artist, art researcher and advocate

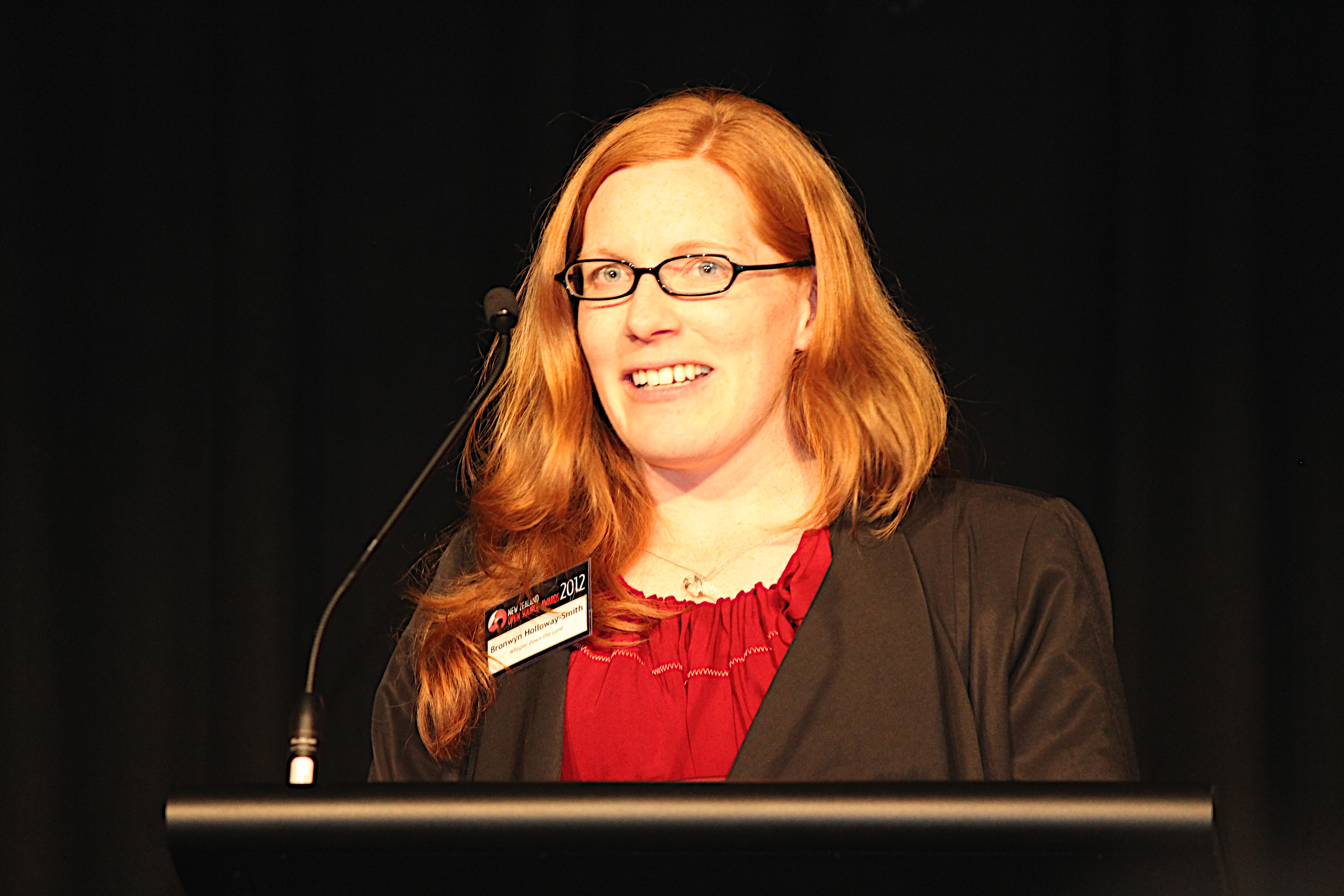
- Holloway-Smith in 2012
- Born: Bronwyn Smith; 1982 (age 43–44); Lower Hutt, New Zealand
- Education: Massey University
- Movement: Conceptual
- Website: hollowaysmith.nz

Bronwyn Holloway-Smith (born Bronwyn Smith, 1982) is co-director of Public Art Heritage Aotearoa New Zealand, a researcher, an advocate and an artist. She studied at Massey University in Wellington and received a doctorate in fine arts from its College of Creative Arts (CoCA; Māori: Toi Rauwhārangi) in 2019. Holloway-Smith often uses investigation and new technology in her work. The subject of her research and advocacy was previously intellectual property rights for artists; it is now public art from the 20th century.

== Working life ==
In 2006, Holloway-Smith graduated with an honours degree in fine arts from Massey University.

=== Between degree and doctorate ===
==== Creative Freedom Foundation ====
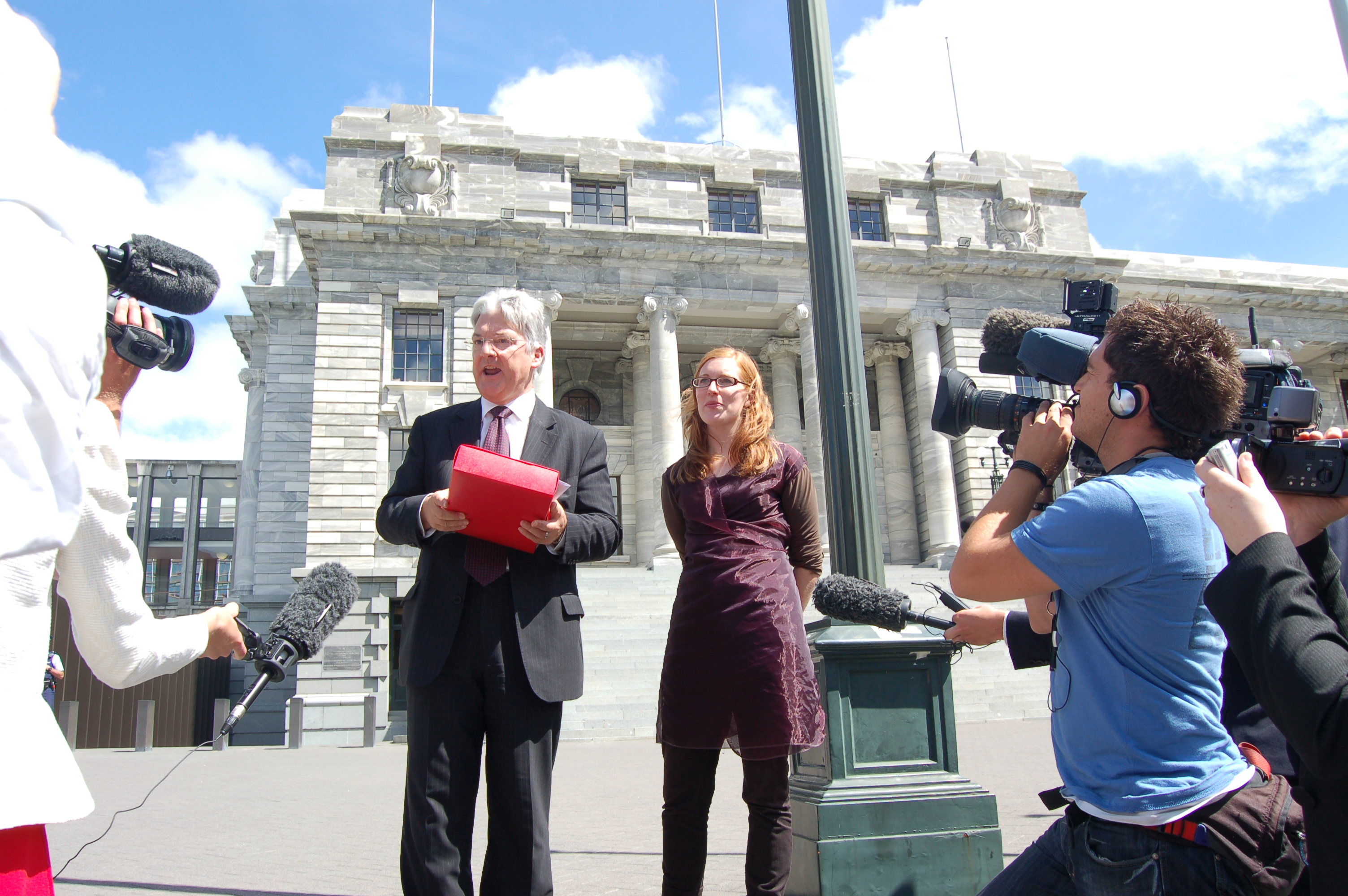
Peter Dunne and Holloway-Smith face media outside Parliament House, first NZ Internet Blackout protest, 19 February 2009

In October 2008, the Copyright Act 1994 was amended by the Fifth Labour Government. The additions included section 92A that said "Internet service provider must have policy for terminating accounts of repeat infringers". It was due to come into force on 28 February 2009. Holloway-Smith supported copyright law to protect the intellectual property of artists. However, she believed section 92A was unjust because it would allow Internet access to be terminated without a fair hearing.

Late in 2008, Holloway-Smith founded the Creative Freedom Foundation (CFF), with her civil union partner, to campaign for the repeal of section 92A. The foundation called for the first New Zealand Internet Blackout 16–23 February 2009 and organised petitions. On 19 February, Holloway-Smith led around 200 protestors at parliament. Peter Dunne MP received the petitions with over 10,000 virtual and 149 written signatures.

The newly-elected Fifth National Government did not bring section 92A into force. In July, they proposed an alternative that narrowed the scope to file sharing networks. Repeat copyright infringers would receive three warnings followed by a hearing at the Copyright Tribunal that could lead to a fine or termination of Internet access. Holloway-Smith said the proposal was "... much better than the previous regime, ...". The Copyright (Infringing File Sharing) Amendment Act 2011 repealed section 92A and added the new regime as section 122.

In July 2014, Holloway-Smith stepped down from CFF to start her doctorate, and the foundation went on hold.

==== Ghosts in the Form of Gifts (2009) ====
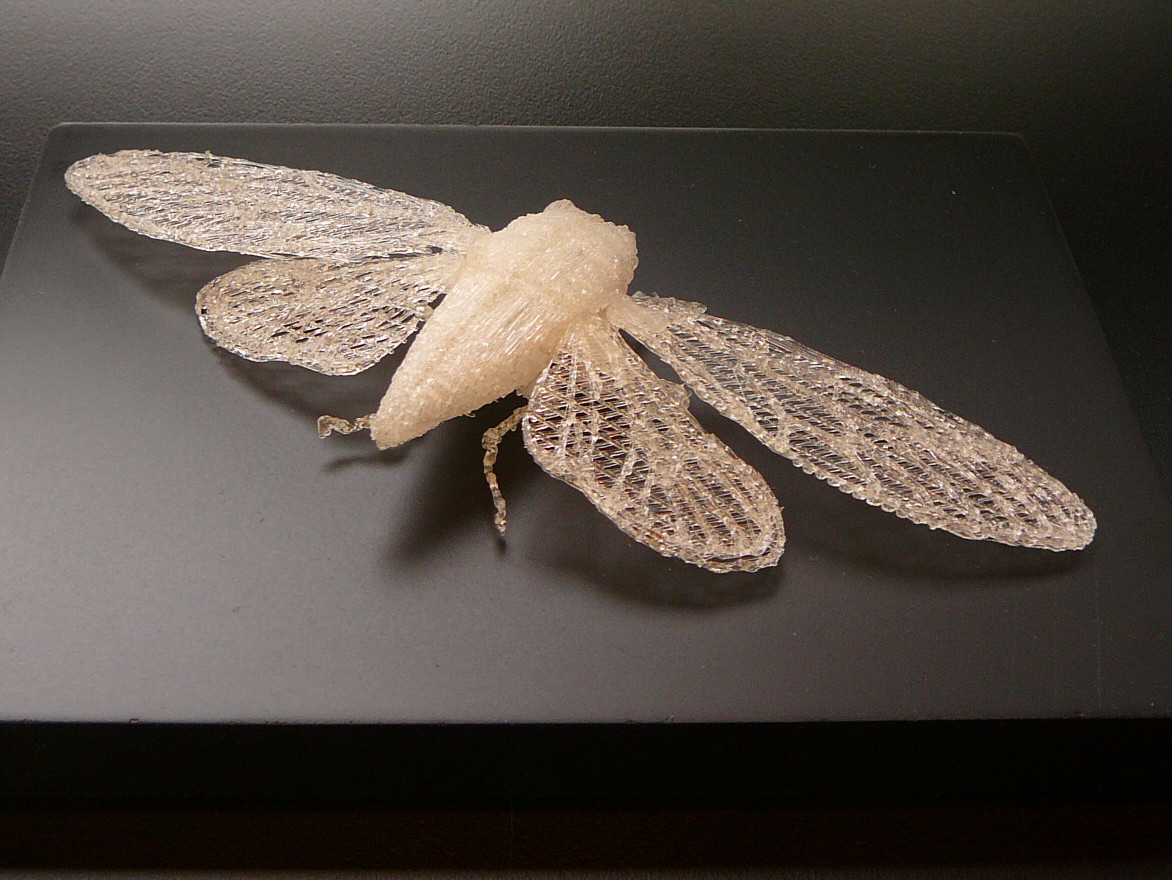
Substitute cicada

Holloway-Smith was commissioned by Massey University to create an artwork for its Wellington campus. The university's CoCA building used to belong to the National Museum of New Zealand that moved out to become Te Papa. Holloway-Smith imagined museum pieces that might have been lost in the move.

Ghosts in the Form of Gifts (2009) was a collection of ten substitute pieces. They were produced with an open design RepRap 3D printer. Natural and man-made pieces were represented in the collection. Holloway-Smith chose man-made originals of generic type and unknown origin, "orphaned works" as she put it, with one exception. They included a Māori matau (English: fish hook) and poi, and a tapa cloth beater. The exception was not a physical piece but a 3D model whose origin was well known: the Utah teapot. Holloway-Smith gifted the 3D printer instructions for the collection from her official website under the Creative Commons Attribution-ShareAlike license.

The collection won the Open Source in the Arts category at the New Zealand Open Source Awards 2010. In 2012, it was shown in Social Interface at Ramp Gallery, Hamilton, and was reviewed by artist Peter Dornauf. He wrote that everyday museum pieces had been transformed by 3D printing. The substitutes "... present themselves as highly tactile yet prohibit touch because of their strange translucent ghostly nature."

==== Pioneer City (2010–2015) ====
Pioneer City was a series of works on extra-terrestrial colonisation inspired by Holloway-Smith's interest in the exploration of Mars.

While searching for a house to buy in Wellington, Holloway-Smith noticed the marketing of real estate off plans. Advertisements lured buyers to property that was promised but not yet built. In 2010, according to her official website, she parodied aspirational real estate advertising with a flyer for the imaginary Colonial Real Estate company's Pioneer development. Typical home interiors looked out over atypical landscapes: rugged, empty and lifeless.

In 2011, Holloway-Smith won the use of a Wellington city centre billboard for art from April to June. She created a marketing campaign to sell the idea of a better life in Pioneer City with advertisements on the billboard and a website. Initially, the location was only hinted at, but Holloway-Smith confirmed it was Mars. Her campaign drew inspiration from marketing the remote colony New Zealand to European settlers in the 19th century.

The campaign continued in the news and arts media with Holloway-Smith anticipating a Pioneer City showroom. Located in Wellington city centre and open four weekends from mid-June 2011, it had a scale model of the city with an agent to handle enquiries. Expressions of interest could be made at the showroom or on the website. By this point, the website had further details on the sustainability of the colony and the lifestyle promised to settlers.

A promotional video for the city was created in 2012. The following year, the model and video were shown in Among the Machines at Dunedin Public Art Gallery. The theme of the exhibition was the evolving relationship between people, nature and technology. One reviewer wrote Holloway-Smith's works were mildly critical, while another found them disturbing.

In the run-up to the 2015 New Zealand flag referendum, Holloway-Smith created a flag for Pioneer City. It won the New Zealand Contemporary Art Award 2015. According to Holloway-Smith's official website, this is the most recent work in the series.

==== Whisper Down the Lane (2012) ====
The Obstinate Object: Contemporary New Zealand Sculpture ran at City Gallery Wellington February–June 2012. Holloway-Smith's Whisper Down the Lane (2012) ran alongside the exhibition and combined her interests in intellectual property rights and 3D technologies.

Holloway-Smith picked one sculpture a week from the exhibition. She discussed copyright with the artist then got permission to create a 3D model of the work and 3D print the model as a miniature. The miniatures were sufficiently transformed from the originals that Holloway-Smith saw them as her works. She named them After ... the original artist and work in acknowledgement. They were shown in the gallery's reading room and sold online. Holloway-Smith gifted the 3D printer instructions for 12 miniatures from her official website under the Creative Commons Attribution-NonCommercial-ShareAlike license.

Whisper Down the Lane was reviewed by art critic Mark Amery. He wrote that it was "... one smart project, charged in its complexity by contemporary issues of copyright, reproduction and future changes to the art market." It won the Open Source in the Arts category at the New Zealand Open Source Awards 2012.

=== Doctorate ===
Between 2014 and 2019, Holloway-Smith researched the effect of international, particularly American, leadership and control over the Internet on the national identity of New Zealand. She investigated the Southern Cross Cable (SX) then responded to it by creating a collection of conceptual artworks.

Opened in 2000, SX was New Zealand's first international broadband cable. Nearly all the nation's Internet traffic went through the cable until 2017. It was built and operated by Spark New Zealand with partners Optus and Verizon from Australia and the United States respectively. Holloway-Smith aimed to demystify SX for the public by showing its route, physical nature and the limits of New Zealand's control over it.

In 2014, Holloway-Smith visited Spark's landing stations in Northcote which connected domestic and international networks. The station for New Zealand's first international telephone cable, closed in the 1980s, contained boxes of colourful ceramic tiles. They belonged to Te Ika-a-Maui (1962) (English: The Fish of Māui) a mural created for the station by New Zealand artist E. Mervyn Taylor (1906–1964). Holloway-Smith's led the restoration of the work and created paintings of lost tiles, and led to the E. Mervyn Taylor Mural Search and Recovery Project.

Arriving from Australia, SX left the Tasman Sea at Muriwai. It went east across the Auckland region through landing stations at Whenuapai and Northcote. Then it entered the Hauraki Gulf at Takapuna and crossed the Pacific Ocean to the United States. In February 2017, Holloway-Smith proposed a work for each coastal and landing site. However, Spark declined, saying public awareness of the landing stations could compromise their security.

A revised collection of works was shown in This Is New Zealand at City Gallery Wellington March–July 2018. They were:

- The Southern Cross Cable: A Tour a guide booklet covering the works in the gallery and the sites that inspired them. Radio New Zealand technology correspondent Sarah Putt completed the tour of the sites. She appreciated it for "... taking something in the technology world and bringing it alive through art but also through participation ...".
- A video of Holloway-Smith's scuba dive to SX in the Hauraki Gulf off Takapuna. It showed the cable was around the diameter of a garden hose lying across the seabed.
- Te Ika-a-Maui restored with replacements for the lost tiles. Originally installed in Northcote, the mural was re-installed in the public library of neighbouring Takapuna in 2019.
- A video about Whenuapai: SX landing station and nearby Royal New Zealand Air Force Base Auckland. In 2014, documents leaked by Edward Snowden suggested that SX had been tapped by the Speargun programme for the Five Eyes intelligence alliance. Holloway-Smith speculated that the tap was in the Whenuapai landing station and the data it extracted was processed on the air base. She laid out circumstantial evidence for the theory in her thesis.
- Seven marker posts, each one engraved with the details of a communications cable at Muriwai, for a proposed walk that was not completed.

Reviewer Amery found the collection uneven. He dismissed the marker posts as "a little unnecessary visual frill" and wondered whether the scuba dive had taken place or been faked. However, he was positive about the Whenuapai video writing "This work isn’t subtle, but it adventurously explores an important subject in ways that cleverly physicalise and visualise the unseen."

Holloway-Smith titled her thesis The Southern Cross Cable: A Tour: Art, the Internet and National Identity in Aotearoa New Zealand. She received her doctorate in 2019.

=== E. Mervyn Taylor Mural Search and Recovery Project ===
Ernest Mervyn Taylor (1906–1964) was a New Zealand artist particularly known for wood engraving. Between 1956 and his death, Taylor was commissioned to create a number of murals, most for spaces where they could be viewed by the public. In 2014, during research for her doctorate, Holloway-Smith found one of them: Te Ika-a-Maui (1962). It was restored by a group that included Taylor's granddaughter. She had compiled a list of Taylor's murals, and shared the list with Holloway-Smith who proposed researching the works to CoCA.

CoCA's forerunners went back to the Wellington School of Design, founded in 1886, via the Wellington Technical College where Taylor studied printmaking in the 1930s. In 2015, the E. Mervyn Taylor Mural Search and Recovery Project was launched for CoCA's 130th anniversary, the following year, with Holloway-Smith as director supported by Sue Elliott.

By 2018, 12 murals had been documented: 11 were originally in public spaces with one in a private boardroom. Of the public murals, four were still accessible and one was being restored. The remainder had suffered various fates: being moved to a private space or an unknown location, being walled in, painted over or destroyed by demolition.

The project aimed to protect Taylor's remaining works, but members of the public also let them know about murals by other artists. Holloway-Smith and Elliott recorded the details in a register which grew to 160 entries. In 2016–17, they consulted with the Ministry for Culture and Heritage (Māori: Manatū Taonga), art historians and property developers on how to protect the nation's public art heritage. This led to the founding of Public Art Heritage Aotearoa New Zealand.

In 2018, the project concluded with the publication of a book Wanted: The Search for the Modernist Murals of E. Mervyn Taylor edited by Holloway-Smith. It was shortlisted for the Ockham New Zealand Book Awards 2019 in the illustrated non-fiction category.

=== Public Art Heritage Aotearoa New Zealand ===
Public Art Heritage Aotearoa New Zealand (PAHANZ) "... is a research initiative to find, document and protect [the nation's] 20th century public art heritage.", according to their website. It is supported by CoCA and the Ministry for Culture and Heritage. The co-directors are Holloway-Smith and Elliott.

In 2019, Holloway-Smith collaborated with Artspace Aotearoa to research public works by New Zealand artist Guy Ngan (1926–2017). In the 1940s, he studied at Wellington Technical College, a forerunner of CoCA. The project documented over 30 works, and one of them inspired Holloway-Smith's Bledisloe Bebop (2020).

In the early 2020s, the ministry funded PAHANZ to raise awareness of public art by putting the register of works on the web. The web register launched in July 2023 with 380 works. In 2024, Wellington City Council supported the addition of further works. As of June 2026, the web register lists 518 works. Each one has a current status for the viewing public: accessible, hidden or lost (whereabouts unknown or destroyed).

==== Bledisloe Bebop (2020) ====
In 1959, the seven-storey Bledisloe State Building, now known as Bledisloe House, opened in Auckland city centre. For the structure on its roof, Ngan created his first major public work Untitled (1956) a glass mosaic frieze.

To get a close view, Holloway-Smith had the work videoed from aerial drones. She then created Bledisloe Bebop (2020) setting shots of the frieze to a recording of bebop from the same era. Public screenings of the video were held in Aotea Square, next to Bledisloe House, during October 2020. As of December 2024, this is the most recent artwork listed on Holloway-Smith's official website.

== Personal life ==
Holloway-Smith lives with her civil union partner and children in Wellington.
