= Fingerboard (disambiguation) =

A fingerboard is a part of a string instrument.

Fingerboard may also refer to:

- Fingerboard (skateboard), a miniature version of a skateboard controlled by the fingers
- Fingerboards, an article of climbing equipment
- Continuum Fingerboard, a continuous pitch performance controller developed by Haken Audio.
- Another name for a ribbon controller for a synthesizer
- Fingerboard (Afrikaans: vingerbord), a South African variant of the traditional board game carrom
