= Felt (website) =

New Zealand craft marketplace website

- Industry: E-commerce
- Founded: 2007
- Founders: Lucy Arnold
- Headquarters: Christchurch, New Zealand
- Website: felt.co.nz

Felt is an online marketplace founded in 2007 for New Zealand-based artists and craftspeople to sell their work.

== Origin ==
Felt was launched in 2007 by Christchurch graphic designer Lucy Arnold, in response to the US craft-selling site Etsy. Arnold, in her mid 20s, had bought a sewing machine in 2005 and made merino arm warmers for friends and family, eventually selling them on Etsy. She decided to create a New Zealand version of the site that allowed people to buy locally made handcrafts and compete with imported mass-produced goods. The success of the New Zealand auction website Trade Me in competing with eBay, at a time when online shopping was still a new concept for New Zealanders, suggested that such a business was workable; Trade Me was a poor fit for craft vendors, as it only allowed items to be listed for one week, and was designed for bargain-hunters. The name Felt was chosen after three weeks of brainstorming because it evoked the material felt, touch, and emotion. The site was set up to allow designers, artists, and craftspeople to promote and sell their hand-made work directly to customers; the only requirement was for the vendor to be resident in New Zealand. Vendors paid a deposit and a small fee per listing, as well as 5 per cent commission to Felt. Arnold's intent was for Felt to support small local businesses and provide a platform for craftspeople beginning their careers.

== Growth ==
The website experienced initial rapid growth, with 500 sellers and 2600 registered users by May 2009, and was one of the top three trading sites in the 2010 New Zealand Netguide Web Awards. After Felt supported the Wellington-originated Craft2.0 events in Christchurch in 2008 and 2009, Arnold organised an inaugural Christchurch craft fair, A Craft Affair, in July 2010. Along with two other crafters Arnold began Crafty Business, a monthly meeting for crafters to discuss marketing and princing their goods.

Felt was badly affected by the 2011 Christchurch earthquake: its premises was red-stickered for demolition and all computer equipment was lost. In June 2011, Felt had 15,000 to 20,000 registered users; this had grown to 64,300 by 2015. The COVID-19 pandemic boosted sales, as part time crafters began to sell their wares online. At a COVID media briefing on 14 April 2020, Prime Minister Jacinda Ardern wore a pair of feather earrings crafted from bicycle inner tubes by a Felt vendor. This led to surge in sales and visitor numbers to the site. By 2023, Felt goods were being sold by 1500 vendors to customers in 56 countries, with the most popular categories being jewellery, infant clothing, and garden art, and vendors were collectively making over $1 million in sales annually. Nevertheless, Felt was still a relatively small business, run by Arnold and three staff working from their homes in central Christchurch.
