= Sabyrtooth =

Sabyrtooth are an American rock duo composed of musicians Coley Carnegie and Abi Mae. They are strongly influenced by hard rock, grunge, heavy metal and punk. Their sound has been described as combining "ethereal, bittersweet vocals" with "visceral guitar riffs" and "blues-influenced drums". Sabyrtooth was formed in fall, 2010, in Los Angeles, California, by Coley (drums and backing vocals) and Abi Mae (guitar and lead vocals).

== History ==
Between 2008 and 2010, Sabyrtooth produced, engineered and starred in Alan Parsons's film series, the Art and Science of Sound Recording. Sabyrtooth collaborated with film producer Mike Fleiss (Hostel, Texas Chainsaw Massacre) on California Wildebeest's eponymously titled EP. The EP was subsequently debuted at Ozzfest 2010. On August 23, 2010, Sabyrtooth's production, Lies, was featured on CBS television series, The Bachelor.

In 2012, Sabyrtooth contributed to Douglass Richardson's album Colte Wolf, which was produced by Andy Johns (Led Zeppelin and Rolling Stones). In 2012–2013 Sabyrtooth toured the United States, England and Scotland. The band spent the latter half of 2013 touring in California.

In 2015, Sabyrtooth released a single "Howl at the Moon" in memory of 8-year-old Maddy Middleton, a Santa Cruz child who was murdered by a local teen. The song was used to open Middleton's memorial at Kaiser Permanente Arena on August 3, 2015. 2016 The band performed live with friends Steel Panther at the Henry Fonda Theatre. In 2017, the Carnegie Music Group was founded in Los Angeles.

In 2018, they performed in San Diego.

== Musical style and influences ==
Sabyrtooth's sound involves elements of classic rock, folk and punk rock. The group cite their core influences as including AC/DC, Metallica, Led Zeppelin, The Clash, David Bowie, Pantera and Guns N' Roses. The band also draws strong inspiration from 90s grunge bands Nirvana, Alice in Chains, and the Jesus and Mary Chain.

Early band manager Lizzie Ripps described their sound as "merging accessible pop rock with a heavier, brooding edge" to create an "edgy, modern, and recklessly gratifying punk-folk hybrid". Mae's vocals have been described as similar to those of Courtney Love, Fiona Apple and Kim Deal.

== Members ==
Abi Mae was born in Oxford, England. She was the lead singer and bassist of all-girl punk band, Jade Banger. She is a proficient bass, guitar and piano player. Her musical arrangement, "Special Guest", is featured in the film The Hammer, based on the life of UFC champion Matt Hamill. Abi Mae has previously collaborated with She & Him, Band of Horses, Rusty Anderson, Abe Laboriel, Jr., the Foo Fighters and Kris Kristofferson.

Coleman "Coley" Carnegie was born in Pittsburgh, Pennsylvania, United States. He has a background in visual arts, namely painting, photography and graphic design. Carnegie was mentored by blues legend Duke Robillard from the age of 16. In the decade prior to forming Sabyrtooth, Carnegie worked as a producer, sound engineer for Alan Parsons and guitarist for Shooter Jennings & the 357's. Carnegie has toured with many bands including Jennings, Charlie Daniels Band, Kings X, Tony Hussle/Floetry and Marsha Ambrosius on Floetry's North American VH1 tour. In collaboration with Scott Storch, Carnegie was a session musician (credited as "Coley Read" on guitar) on Paris Hilton's album Paris. He cites Led Zeppelin/Rolling Stones producer Andy Johns and Alan Parsons as close friends and mentors. As an actor and a musician Coley Carnegie has appeared on a number of television programs, including;

- Conan
- Last Call with Carson Daly
- The Late Late Show with Craig Ferguson
- Country Music Television: Shooter Jennings' Studio 330 Sessions
- VH1 Soul: Floetry Live in Manhattan.
- Disney Channel Original Series: Jonas L.A.

=== Carnegie Family ===
Coleman & Abigail Carnegie are the great-great-great-grandson and daughter in law of industrial steel magnate Thomas M. Carnegie, and nephew/niece of Andrew Carnegie. They are associated with Cumberland Island National Seashore, the Carnegie family residence known for the private wedding of John F. Kennedy Jr and Carolyn Bessette-Kennedy, as well as Skibo Castle in Scotland where Madonna and Guy Ritchie married.

=== Street Art & Fashion ===
Sabyrtooth also make street art in graffiti style using wheat paste, stencils and stickers. They are well known for creating images of Queen Elizabeth, Darth Vadyr, Big Cats, Cobras and collaborating with artist Sheppard Fairey.

The duo has been featured multiple times in Vice Magazine including journalistic pieces written by the band itself and their exploits while living in Malibu with Daryl Hannah.

Beginning in March 2016 the Carnegie's have donated all of the profits from Sabyrtooth's clothing line to charities committed to ending child and adult sexual abuse, and to supporting survivors in need of legal assistance, relocation, healthcare and counselling.

== Discography ==
- "The Dogs Are Out (feat. Alan Parsons)" Produced by Sabyrtooth & Alan Parsons (B-Side Rarity, 2012)
- Tales from the Canterbury (2011), the group's first EP, was named after the Los Angeles apartment building the record was recorded in.
- My Daydream (2010) was commissioned by skateboard film director Jesse Shane Sanchezas a musical score for the film My Daydream. The film starred members of the ZJ skateboarding house team, including Socrates Leal, Alec Beck, Marko Jazbinsek, Justin Cefai, Josue Campos and Mathew Leeb. The film was edited into a commercial for the Tech Deck fingerboard company.
- "Laugh Until I Die" (2018) Produced by Sabyrtooth & Andy Johns.
