= Sam Morgan (entrepreneur) =

New Zealand entrepreneur

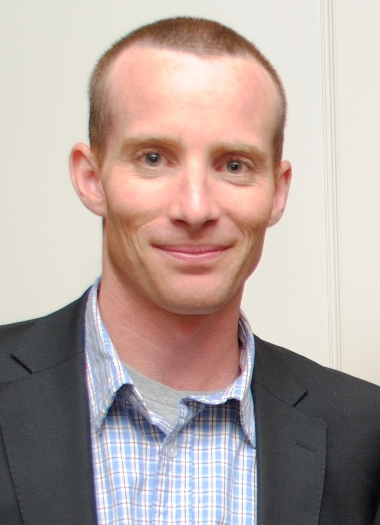
- Morgan in 2010
- Born: 1975 (age 50–51)
- Occupations: Entrepreneur, Investor
- Relatives: Gareth Morgan (father)

Sam Morgan (born 1975) is best known as the founder of Trade Me, New Zealand's largest online auction site, which he sold in 2006 to Australian media company Fairfax for over NZ$700 million.

== Personal history ==
Morgan grew up in Wellington, New Zealand, with his father economist Gareth Morgan and mother Jo Morgan a local bus driver. He attended Newtown School, Rongotai College and Victoria University of Wellington before opting out in 1995.

== Professional history ==
Morgan worked for IT consultancy Deloitte before leaving to start up Trade Me in 1999. Trade Me kept him very busy and at one point he was living 200 metres from the main office on Wellington Waterfront. On March 6, 2006, John Fairfax Holdings agreed to buy Trade Me for NZ$700 million, plus another NZ$50 million if financial targets were met over the next two years. Sam Morgan received $227 million (excluding future bonuses), making him one of the richest people in New Zealand overnight.

Morgan is now an investor and advisor to a number of start-up businesses and is also involved with several not-for-profit organisations including Medicine Mondiale and One Acre Fund. He was a co-founder of the Pacific Fibre project, and majority owner and chairman of vWorkApp, a cloud-based dispatch and scheduling product. He is a director of Trade Me, Xero (software) and Vend (software).

In 2010 Morgan was awarded an Honorary Fellowship of the New Zealand Computer Society (HFNZCS).

== Philanthropy ==
In 2006, following the sale of Trade Me, Morgan founded and endowed Jasmine Social Investments, a private foundation focused on high impact philanthropy. As at 2014, he had around 20 philanthropic projects, a number of them focused on alleviating the effects of poverty.
