= David Jones (YouTuber) =

YouTuber from New Zealand

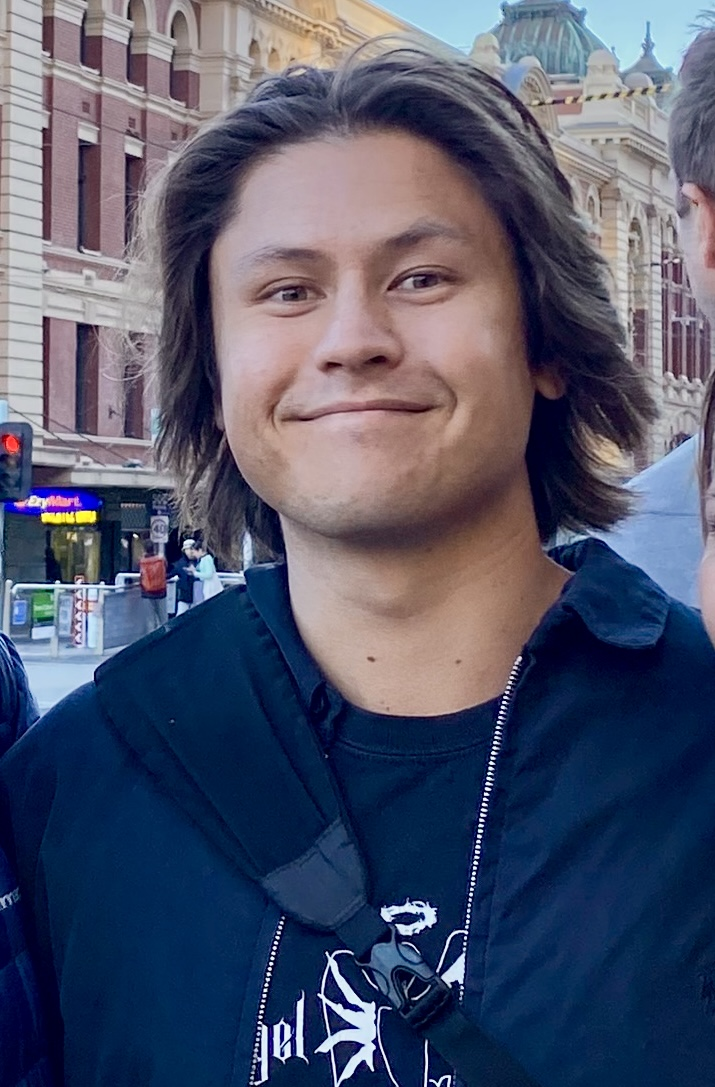
- David Jones at Melbourne Central, March 2025

YouTube information
- Channel: davidsjones
- Years active: 2016–present
- Genres: Snowboarding, fingerboarding, skateboarding, DIY
- Subscribers: 979 thousand
- Views: 224 million
- Last updated: November 2026

David Andrew Jones, known online as davidsjones, is a New Zealand YouTuber, filmmaker, and content creator. His videos combine personal storytelling with action sports such as snowboarding, fingerboarding, skateboarding, surfing, and DIY projects. Jones is known for his recurring Fingerboard Week series, large-scale DIY builds, collaborations with Red Bull, and a charity project in which he built and auctioned a cardboard Lamborghini to raise funds for Auckland’s Starship Children’s Hospital.

== Early life and background ==
Jones attended Wentworth College in Auckland, where he represented the school in the North Island Snowboarding Championships at Turoa Ski Field in 2016, winning the slope style competition in the terrain park.

== Career ==
Jones launched his YouTube channel in 2012, producing videos on action sports and DIY projects, including building fingerboard skateparks, making custom snowboards and surfboards.

He created the recurring video series Fingerboard Week, featuring fingerboard-related challenges, tutorials, and obstacle constructions. He discussed the origins of the series in an interview with the Finger Space podcast.

Jones’s DIY projects have been covered in the media. Bike Mag documented his miniature recreation of the Red Bull Hardline mountain bike course for a Fingerboarding video.

In addition to video production, Jones runs an online store selling apparel and fingerboard products under Pork Fingerboards brand.

=== Red Bull collaborations ===
Jones has worked with Red Bull on several projects. In 2022, he created cardboard wings and performed at the Red Bull Flugtag in Auckland. In 2024, Bike Mag reported on his miniature recreation of the Red Bull Hardline course in Wales.

In February 2025, his team "David Jones Whale Rider" competed in the Red Bull Trolley Grand Prix (also known as the Red Bull Soapbox Race) at Auckland Domain, covered by the New Zealand Herald and TVNZ’s TikTok channel. That same year, Jones designed the “Tunnel Vision” obstacle for Red Bull Ibiza Royale, an obstacle race atop Ibiza Castle, featuring lighting and sound alterations to challenge participants’ mental endurance. He discussed the design process in an interview with Trish Medalen.

=== Other platforms ===
Jones also posts fingerboard content and personal updates on Instagram under the handle @dayvidjones.

== Charity and fundraising ==
In 2021, Jones built a 75% scale cardboard replica of a Lamborghini Aventador, nicknamed the Cardborghini, which he auctioned on Trade Me to raise funds for Auckland’s Starship Children’s Hospital, where he had previously received treatment. The auction raised NZ$10,420, which was donated in full to the hospital.

The project was reported by major New Zealand media including the NZ Herald, Stuff, Otago Daily Times, and TVNZ’s Seven Sharp, and was also covered internationally by Malay Mail, A Current Affair (Australia), South Korean news outlets, UNTV News & Rescue (Philippines), and Todo Noticias (Argentina).

== Personal life ==
Jones is based in New Zealand and frequently travels abroad to create content. He has featured snowboarding trips to Japan, North America, Europe, and New Zealand in his videos.
