= New Zealand Internet Blackout =

2009 New Zealand internet services protest

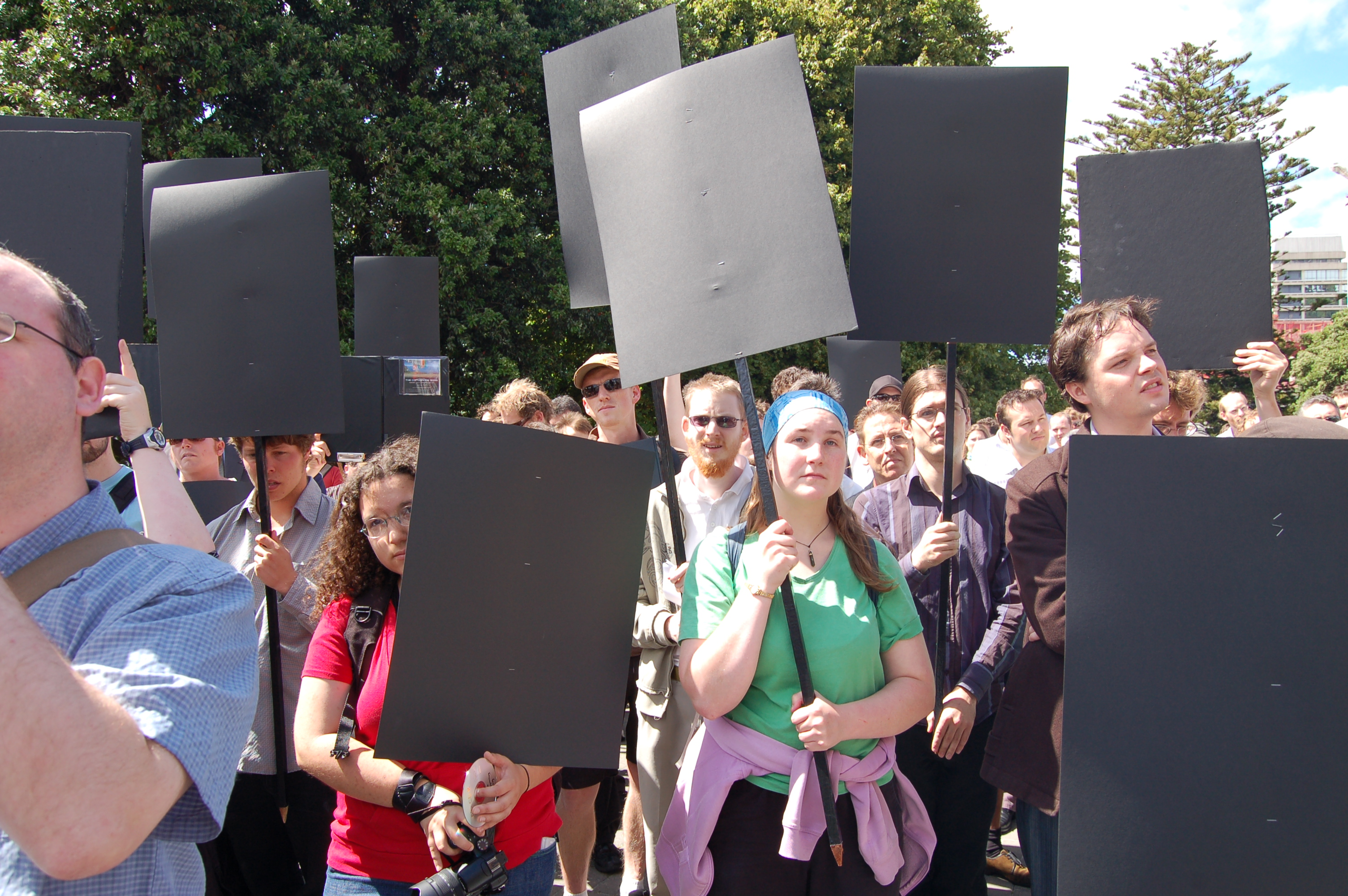
Protesters outside Parliament House on 19 February 2009 holding up black avatars

The New Zealand Internet Blackout was an online protest organised by the Creative Freedom Foundation NZ (CFFNZ) against changes to copyright law in New Zealand. It constituted two separate blackouts: one in 2009 to protest Section 92A of the Copyright (New Technologies) Amendment Act 2008; and another in 2011 to protest the Copyright (Infringing File Sharing) Amendment Act 2011, although the CFFNZ did not take part in this one.

== First blackout ==
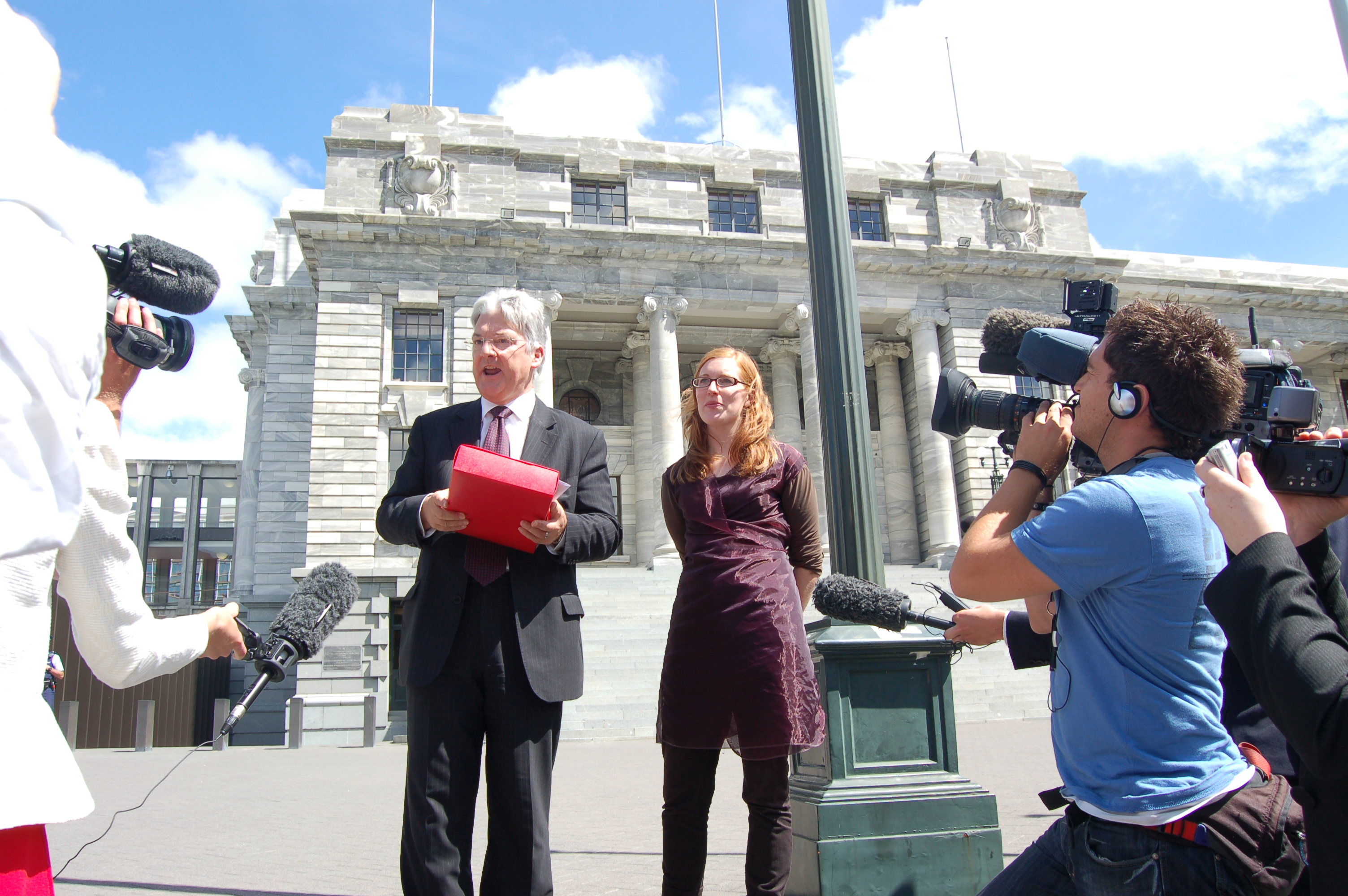
MP Peter Dunne and Bronwyn Holloway-Smith addressing the protesters

The protest originated at the 2009 Kiwi Foo Camp in Warkworth and ran from 16 to 23 February. Internet users changed their avatars to black squares, to symbolise what opponents of Section 92A regard as guilt by accusation. In particular, they point to the clause in Section 92A which states "Internet service providers must have policy for terminating accounts of repeat infringers". Additionally, protesters were encouraged to sign a petition and/or write to their MP.

Notable supporters of the blackout campaign included Russell Brown, Nathan Torkington, Stephen Fry, Neil Gaiman, Cory Doctorow, Leo Laporte, and technology journalist Juha Saarinen who asked Fry if he would help out with the protest.

On 19 February 2009 about 200 people, including internet service provider (ISP) representatives, artists, musicians, writers, and bloggers – most of them holding up plain black placards, and some with taped mouths – protested and presented a petition outside Parliament at lunchtime. Bronwyn Holloway-Smith of the Creative Freedom Foundation led the protesters. Wellington-based MP Peter Dunne addressed the protesters, announcing that on the previous day he had separate meetings with Commerce Minister Simon Power and Prime Minister John Key over the issue.

On 23 February, Prime Minister John Key announced that Section 92A would be delayed until 27 March. Subsequently, on Monday, 23 March, it was announced that Section 92A would be removed and redrafted.

The online petition maintained by the CFFNZ had over 17,000 signatures.

== Second blackout ==
Anti-piracy legislation was re-introduced in April 2011 by the New Zealand Government under the Copyright (Infringing File Sharing) Amendment Act 2011. Although somewhat watered down from the original Section 92A legislation, it still contained forcible disconnection provisions, and was passed under urgency by all parties with the exception of the Greens and two dissident MPs, Chris Carter and Hone Harawira. This use of urgency was highly controversial, with many in the Internet community accusing the Government of invoking urgency to push through highly contentious laws. Additionally, many opponents of the new law called for a return of the 2009 blackout, who also ridiculed the televised performances of several MPs who defended the law. The CFFNZ did not take part in this second blackout.

== See also ==
- Awareness avatar
- Copyright law of New Zealand
