= Copyright (New Technologies) Amendment Act 2008 =

Act of Parliament in New Zealand

New Zealand Parliament
- Royal assent: 11 April 2008

Related legislation
- Copyright Act 1994
- Status: Current legislation

The Copyright (New Technologies) Amendment Act 2008 was an act passed by the New Zealand Parliament amending the Copyright Act 1994. It received Royal Assent on 11 April 2008.

== Background ==
In 2001, the Ministry of Economic Development initiated a major review of copyright law, in light of new technologies, such as media in digital form and communications via the internet.

== Details ==
The Act makes many changes, some of which include:

- The repealing of Section 4, which defined "cable programme service" and other terms.
- Sections 92A–92E added involving liability of Internet Service Providers.

=== Section 92A ===
Sections 92A in particular drew widespread opposition, including the online New Zealand Internet Blackout campaign. The Section 92A proposal was being led by Judith Tizard.

== Implementation and delays ==
Most of the Act took effect on 31 October 2008, but section 19(2) (which deals with importing films) took effect earlier on 12 April 2008.

In response to the New Zealand Internet Blackout the controversial new section 92A of the Copyright Act (inserted by section 53) has been delayed until 27 March 2009. Sections 48 and 85 (which deal with public playing of communication works) do not yet have a date set when they will take effect.

In response to the pullout by TelstraClear from the proposed Code of Practice for ISPs, and citing "fundamental flaws" in section 92A, the Government has shelved the section, and will be redrafting the law.

== Reception ==
The Recording Industry Association of New Zealand (RIANZ), some members of the Australasian Performing Right Association and SKY Network Television support the Act.

In December 2008, the Creative Freedom Foundation started a campaign (named the New Zealand Internet Blackout) criticising changes to Section 92 included in the Act. The group claims these will introduce "guilt upon accusation".

Several other organisations added their disapproval to the record, including the New Zealand Open Source Society, InternetNZ, the New Zealand Computer Society, the Telecommunications User Association of New Zealand, and the Library and Information Association of New Zealand Aotearoa. The Act was opposed by New Zealand artists, technology specialists, ISPs, businesses, media commentators, librarians and members of the public. The nature of the law changes and the campaign against them has attracted attention internationally.

Critics of the Act say that disconnecting an Internet connection, which Tizard has said is a basic human right, is a disproportionate penalty for a civil infringement. ISPs said that, if the law came into effect on 28 February 2009, they would have to cut off access and take down web pages on the basis of accusation of copyright infringement, rather than face legal action from rights-holder organisations. On 23 February 2009, the Prime Minister, John Key, announced that the law's entering into force would be delayed till 27 March 2009 to allow for a code of practice to be negotiated; and that, should the negotiations fail, the law would be 'suspended' (remain out of force indefinitely). He also stated that the stronger copyright laws, including the controversial section 92a, were required for New Zealand to be able to negotiate a free trade agreement with America.

In March 2009, TelstraClear announced its withdrawal from a proposed Code of Practice for internet providers, effectively side-lining Section 92A. Google has also signalled its opposition to Section 92A, warning that the amendment would 'undermine the "incredible social and economic benefits" of the internet and was disproportionate to the problem it aimed to address.'

In response to the feedback received, on Monday 22 March, Prime Minister John Key announced that the Government would throw out the controversial section, and that Justice minister Simon Power would initiate a rewrite.

== See also ==
- Copyright law of New Zealand
