= Tech Deck Skateboarding =

2001 video game

- Developer: Handheld Games
- Publisher: Activision
- Platform: Game Boy Color
- Release: NA: March 26, 2001; EU: 2001
- Genre: Sports
- Mode: Single-player

Tech Deck Skateboarding is a Game Boy Color game developed by Handheld Games and released in 2001, based upon the Tech Deck brand of fingerboard skateboard toys.

== Gameplay ==
A screenshot of gameplay in Tech Deck Skateboarding.

Tech Deck Skateboarding features over 40 levels, consisting of 10 unique skate parks each with 4 courses. The player is required to collect 50 Tech Deck skateboards, featuring designs from brands such as Birdhouse and Zero. Gameplay is trick-based, requiring players to navigate obstacles and fixtures such as half-pipes and rails across courses. Courses are time-limited and performing tricks provides the player with more time to uncover new Tech Deck boards. There are three difficulty levels to complete, and a free-play mode for players to navigate courses without a time limit.

== Reception ==
Reception

Review scores
Publication	Score
GameSpot	7.5
IGN	4/10
Nintendo Power	2.5/5
Nintendojo	6.0
Game Vortex	20%
Game Boy Extreme	88%

Tech Deck Skateboarding received mixed reviews. Positive reviews focused upon the simplicity and accessibility of the gameplay, with Frank Provo of GameSpot praising the "great deal of gameplay" which is "quick to pick up, easy to learn, hard to master, and quite painless - enabling players of all ages and skill levels to enjoy the game".

Negative reviews of Tech Deck Skateboarding focused on the game's repetitive gameplay and limited playtime. Jon Griffith of IGN, who dismissed the game as "extremely bad", stated the "collection-based gameplay wears thin quickly", noting the limited motivation behind collecting the "flat, unimpressive reproductions" of Tech Deck boards. Frank Provo of GameSpot conceded that "Even on the X-Treme difficulty level, most players will acquire all 40 boards in a matter of one to two hours." Nintendo Power stated "the play control is inaccurate and unintuitive. The game itself is incredibly boring."
