= Albany Senior High School, Auckland =

Albany Senior High School
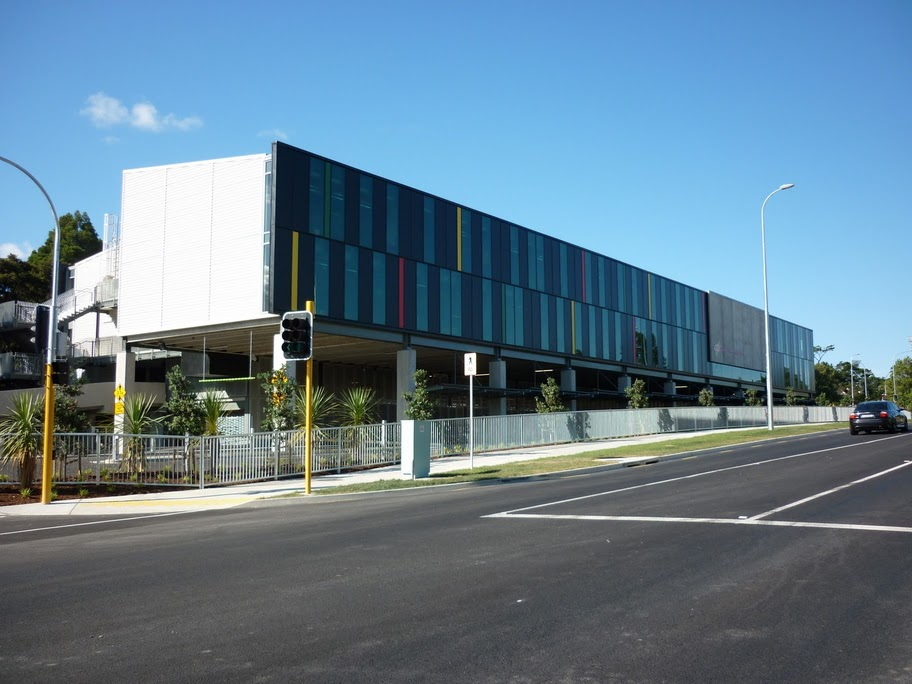
- The school's main building from Albany Highway

Location
- 536 Albany Highway; Albany; Auckland 0632; New Zealand; 36.730°S 174.696°E

Information
- Type: State coed secondary, years 11–13
- Established: 2009
- Ministry of Education Institution no.: 563
- Principal: Ms Claire Amos
- Enrolment: 765 (July 2026)
- Socio-economic decile: 10Z
- Website: www.ashs.school.nz

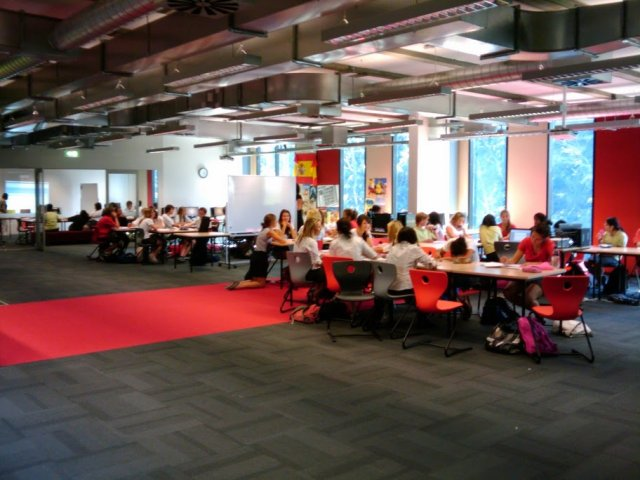
A learning common

Albany Senior High School is a state coeducational senior secondary school situated in Albany, Auckland, New Zealand.

Opened in February 2009, it was New Zealand's first state senior secondary school, catering for students in Years 11 to 13 (ages 14 to 18) only; most New Zealand secondary schools traditionally cater for Years 9 to 13. As of July 2026, the school has a roll of 765 students.

== History ==
Albany Senior High School was established to cater for the population growth on Auckland's North Shore. It was the first new state secondary school to open in the area since Long Bay College in 1975.

Before its construction, there were protracted disputes about the siting of the school which delayed the process, so that the school initially ran from the site of its sister school, Albany Junior High School.

== Enrolment ==
As of July 2026, Albany Senior High School has a roll of 765 students, of which 84 (11.0%) identify as Māori.

As of 2026, the school has an Equity Index of 446, placing it amongst schools whose students have below average socioeconomic barriers to achievement (roughly equivalent to deciles 6 and 7 under the former socio-economic decile system).

== Classes ==
All classes except those which require other resources take place in large open plan areas called 'Learning Commons'. These spaces enable flexibility when planning and delivering classes, including the ability to combine two classes into one for some activities, combining similar curriculum areas, such as physics and mathematics and easy access to technology. Students can utilise mobile devices such as laptops and cellphones to edit Google Docs in real-time together. Students are able to use Gchat in class to ask and answer questions, and students are permitted to perform searches on Google to answer teachers' questions. The teaching periods are 100 minutes long, twice the length of typical periods in New Zealand.

Every Wednesday, students engage in a 'community based' impact project. This involves performing an act for the community. Impact projects completed include forming a business, organising and performing a 'School of Rock' concert, building a video server and digital signage solution for the school, restoring local waterways, designing, building and programming a robot for the Robocup competition and creating original artworks for the school.

== Open source ==
From 2009 to 2019 Albany Senior High School's computer network, desktops and staff laptops ran almost entirely on open source software. The school's student management system is the only major exception, using a proprietary system due to the unavailability of an open-source system meeting New Zealand requirements. The school won an award for the 'Best Open Source Project in Education' at the New Zealand Open Source Awards 2010.
