= New Zealand Open Source Society =

- Formation: 2003
- Founder: Peter Harrison
- Type: NGO
- Purpose: Promotion of free and open-source software
- Location: Wellington
- President: Dave Lane
- Website: www.nzoss.nz

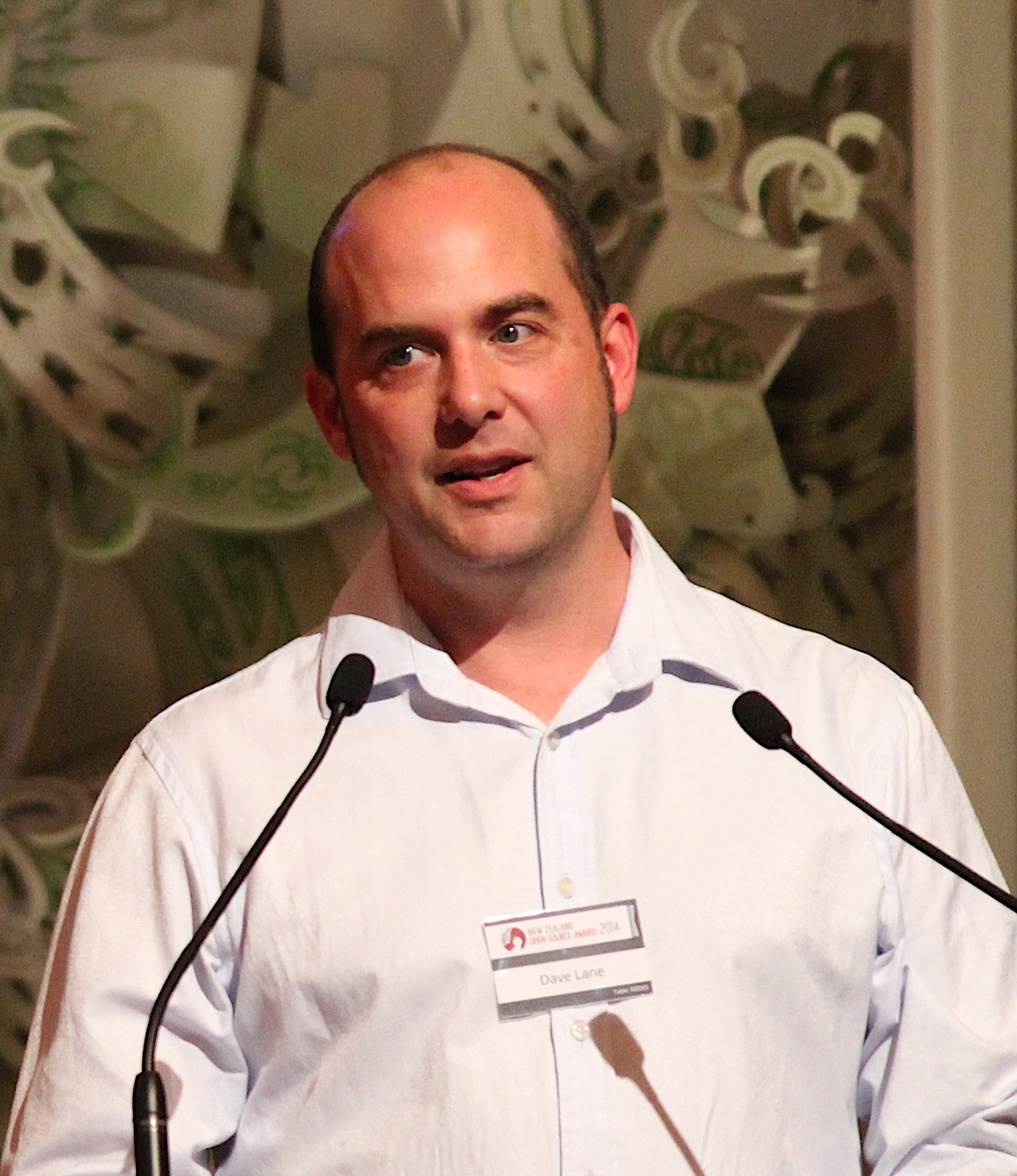
Dave Lane, current President of the New Zealand Open Source Society

The New Zealand Open Source Society is an incorporated society supporting the advocacy and promotion of open-source software in New Zealand.

== History ==
=== Formation ===
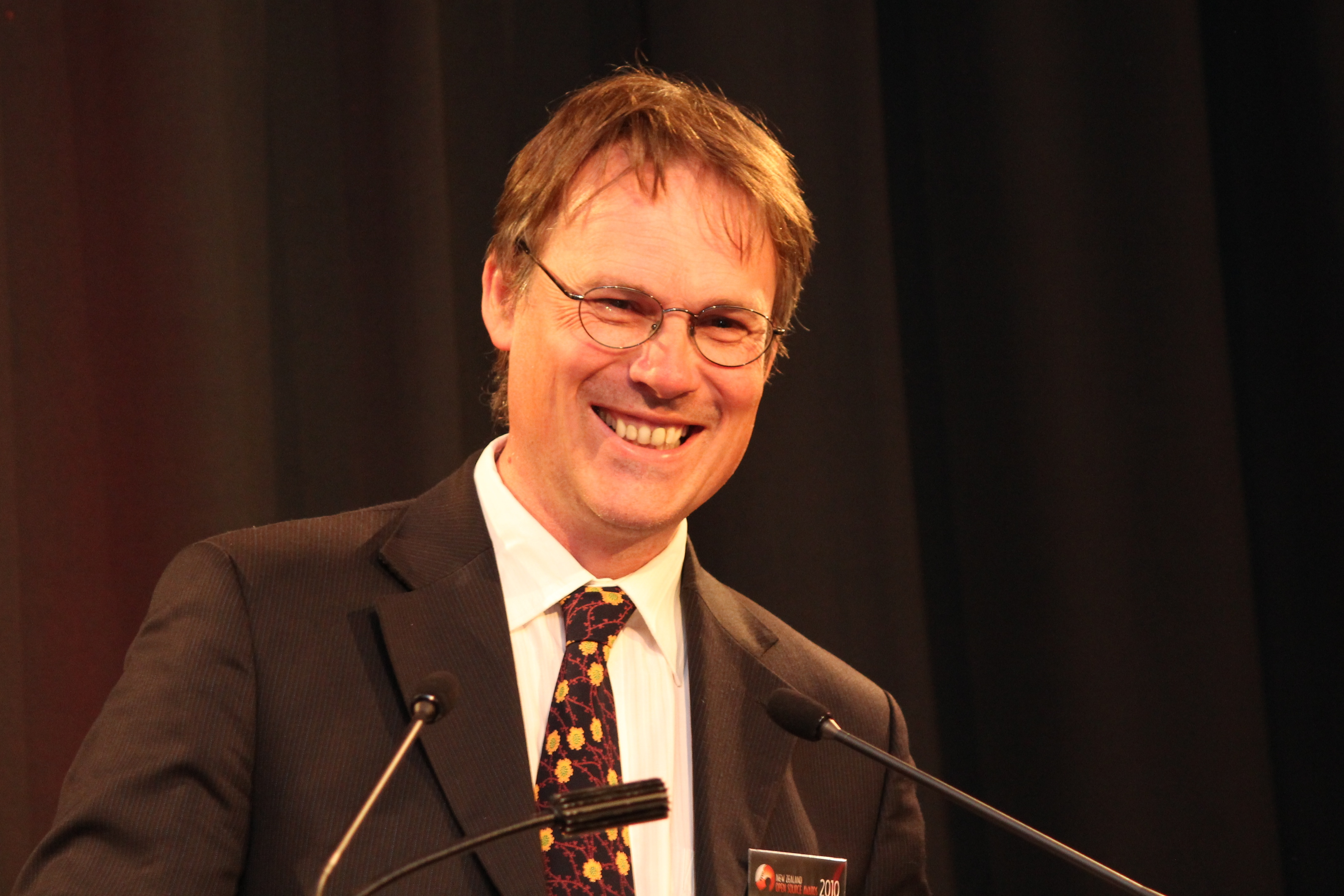
Don Christie, former President of the Society, in 2009

NZOSS was formed in February 2003, after David Lane wrote an open letter suggesting the use of open source software in Government in 2002, co-signed by over four hundred New Zealanders.

Peter Harrison then suggested that a national organisation be formed to promote and advocate use of open-source software, via the New Zealand Linux Users Group. This led to several meetings throughout New Zealand in 2002 and 2003, and finally resulted in the NZOSS being formed as a formal incorporated society on 27 February 2003. Since this time the NZOSS has been involved with various efforts to promote open source in government, including participation with the Ministry of Economic Development's Authentication Project, and later a report on the State Services Commission guidelines on the legal issues of open-source software.

=== Current operation ===
The society has an active mailing list known as 'OpenChat', which is open to participation from anyone with an interest in free/open source software (F/OSS) and the business of the society. Membership of the society is required for voting rights, and helps sustain the society, but is not required in order to be active in NZOSS discussions and activities.

== Campaigns ==
=== Patent action ===
In 2005 the NZOSS formally objected to a New Zealand Patent 525484, a patent for "Word-processing document stored in a single XML file that may be manipulated by applications that understand XML". The opposition was based on evidence cited by the United States Patent and Trademark Office who rejected the patent in the United States. The NZOSS withdrew their opposition in August 2006 as a consequence of Microsoft significantly amending the patent such that Abiword would no longer constitute prior use or prior publication.

In 2009 the NZOSS made a submission to the Commerce Select Committee considering the Patent Bill before Parliament. The submission proposed that software be excluded from being patentable. The Commerce Select Committee agreed with the submission, excluding software from patents. Minister Simon Power has publicly stated that he supports the decision of the Commerce Select Committee.

=== Copyright legislation ===
During 2008 and 2009 the NZOSS and its members were vocal in their opposition to the Anti Counterfeiting Trade Agreement (ACTA), and in proposed changes to New Zealand copyright law (notably Section 92A of the Copyright (New Technologies) Amendment Act 2008. NZOSS have spoken with Members of Parliament and made submissions to the select committee involved.

=== Use of free and open-source software in government ===
In August 2009 the society announced the launch of the Public Sector Remix project to demonstrate the viability of free open-source software on public sector desktops. A number of central, regional and local government agencies worked together with the society to run trials using free software for common desktop tasks.

== New Zealand Open Source Awards ==
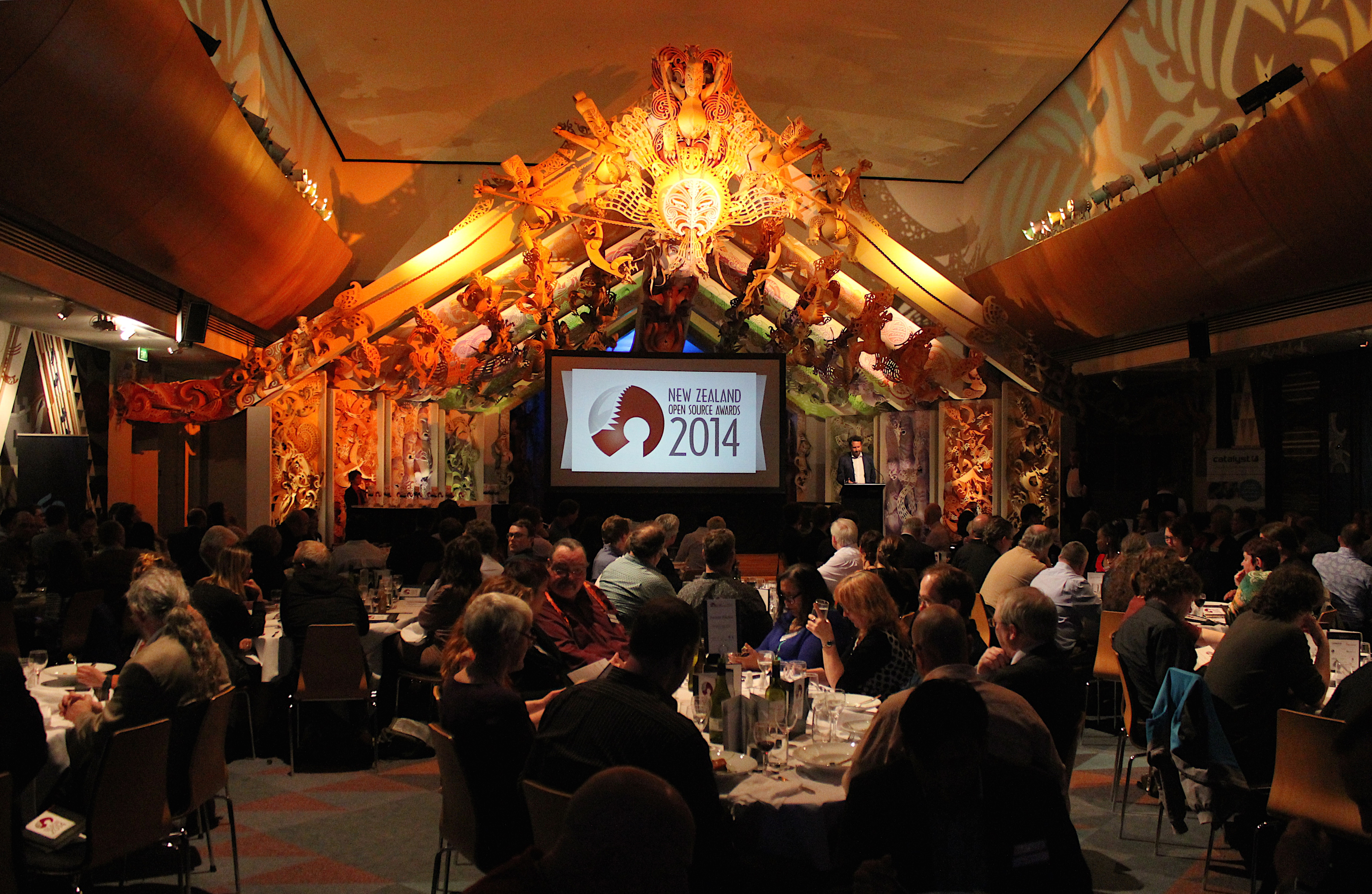
The 2014 New Zealand Open Source Awards, held at Te Papa in Wellington

The inaugural New Zealand Open Source Awards were held in 2007, with the society involved in both organisation and sponsorship. These awards now run bi-annually and serve to showcase the contributions of New Zealanders directly to open-source projects or the promotion of open source generally, as well as exemplary use of open source by New Zealand organisations. The Awards help to raise awareness of the open-source advantage for New Zealand by telling some powerful success stories based on real achievements.

Then awards were held again in 2008 and have run biennially since then. The most recent awards were held at Te Papa Tongarewa on 23 October 2018.

== See also ==
- Software patents and free software
