= New Zealand Open Source Awards =

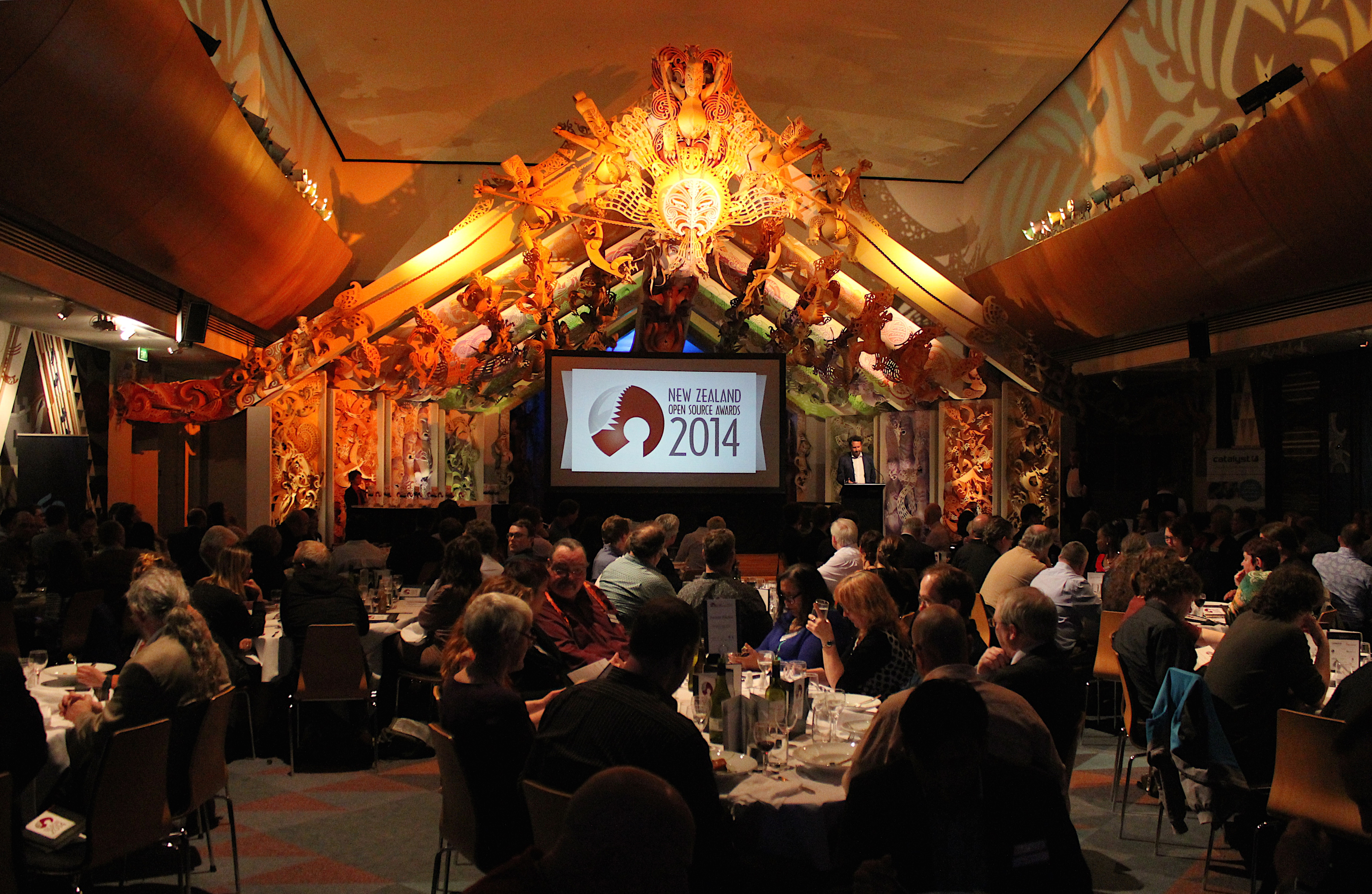
The 2014 awards ceremony

The New Zealand Open Source Awards celebrate open source developments in New Zealand at a biannual awards ceremony, held since 2007. The awards are run by the New Zealand Open Source Society.

== Past winners of New Zealand Open Source Awards ==
	2007	2008	2010	2012	2014	2016	2018	2021
Open source use in government	State Services Commission (ICT Branch)	Radio New Zealand	IRD's use of Moodle	GeoNet Rapid (by GNS Science)	Common Web Platform	DigialNZ and National Library of New Zealand for DigitalNZ	The Service Innovation Lab for the Rates Rebates Alpha and Family Services Directory API	Ministry of Health for the NZ COVID Tracer application
Open source use in business	Zoomin / ProjectX	Egressive / Dave Lane	Ponoko	Totara Learning Management System	DiamondMind – DiamondAge and Mindkits	Catalyst for The Catalyst Cloud	Sparks Interactive for the Drupal Sector distribution and sector.org.nz	Te Hiku Media and Whare Kōrero
Open source use in education [in later years also included Social Services and Youth]	New Zealand Summer of Code	Mahara	Albany Senior High School	Manaiakalani	Catalyst Open Source Academy	City Housing, Wellington City Council for Wellington City Housing Computer Hubs	AUT Library For Tuwhera	NZSL Share by Deaf studies Research Unit, Victoria University of Wellington and Ackama partnering with JR McKenzie Trust's Deaf Development Fund and MSD Office for Disability Issues
Open source software project	New Zealand Open GPS	SilverStripe	SilverStripe	Piwik	fyi.org.nz	Paul Cambell for The OneRNG project	The Faucet Foundation - SDN Controller project	Toitū Te Whenua Land Information New Zealand Basemap Service
Open source contributor	Chris Cormack for Koha	Robert O'Callahan	Tabitha Roder for One Laptop Per Child (OLPC)	Grant McLean for work on Perl and wider community	Andrew Bartlett for Samba4 leadership	Eileen McNaughton’s contribution to CiviCRM	Victoria Spagnolo - for contributions to the Drupal Project and Drupal Migrate	Evonne Cheung's contributions to the Mahara project: Graphically designing an open source project
Open source advocate			Linux.conf.au organisers Andrew & Susanne Ruthven					
Open source in social services [in later years was merged into broadened Education category]	Vet Learn	FLOSS Manuals		Soup Hub and WCC Housing Computer Hubs	UC CEISMIC programme			
Open science award – creating the Commons				GNS Science for Data Policy and Services	Auckland Bioengineering Institute	The Cacophony Project for bring back the bird song to New Zealand	Kea Sightings Project for the Kea Database	Centre for Computational Evolution for BEAST 2
Open art award	Select Parks		Bronwyn Holloway-Smith for "Ghosts in the Form of Gifts" (Te Papa)	Bronwyn Holloway-Smith for "Whisper Down The Lane"	Birgit Bachler for "Copy Wildly"	Make/Use Team, Massey University for Make/Use: User Modifiable Zero Waste Fashion	Wellington Independent Arts Trust for Urban Dream Brokerage	Vicki Smith and Breathe an artist contribution to urban waterway engagement
Open source people's choice award			Amie McCarron for the Alcoholics Anonymous NZ websites	Sofa Statistics	Rob Elshire	Brent Wood for services to Geospatial Open Source in New Zealand and Office of the Privacy Commissioner for Priv-O-Matic	Whare Hauora sensors project Whare Hauora Sensors	Nicholson Consulting in partnership with Te Rourou, Vodafone Foundation Aotearoa, Centre for Social Impact and Deloitte for Thriving Rangatahi Population Explorer
Promoting open culture				Warrington School for the Ubuntu Room radio station				
Clinton Bedogni prize for open systems			Robert O'Callahan		Koray Atalag (University of Auckland)	Peter Gutmann	Dr. Richard Lobb	
Open Source special awards							Brenda Wallace and Lillian Hetet-Owen	
