= Recorded Music NZ =

New Zealand trade association

- Location: Auckland, New Zealand
- CEO: Jo Oliver
- Chairperson: Louise Bond
- Website: recordedmusic.co.nz

Recorded Music NZ (formerly the Recording Industry Association of New Zealand; RMNZ) is a non-profit trade association of record producers, distributors and recording artists who sell recorded music in New Zealand. Membership of Recorded Music NZ is open to any owner of recorded music rights operating in New Zealand, inclusive of major labels (such as Sony, Universal and Warner Music Group), independent labels and self-released artists. Recorded Music NZ has over 2000 rights-holders.

Prior to June 2013 the association called itself the "Recording Industry Association of New Zealand" (RIANZ). RIANZ and PPNZ Music Licensing merged and renamed themselves "Recorded Music NZ".

Recorded Music NZ functions in three areas:

- Member services (the Aotearoa Music Awards, the Official Aotearoa Music Charts, music grants and direct services to artists and labels)
- Music licensing (undertaken independently or, in most cases, via OneMusic, a joint licensing venture between Recorded Music NZ and APRA)
- Pro Music services (regarding copyright protection and corporate affairs)

Recorded Music NZ also operates as a joint trustee (with APRA) of the New Zealand Music Hall of Fame.

== History ==
The New Zealand Federation of Phonographic Industry (NZFPI) was established in 1957 to collectively represent copyright licensing on behalf of right owners. It later changed its name to Phonographic Performances New Zealand (PPNZ), and then PPNZ Music Licensing. In 1972 a new trade body was established called Recording Industry Association of New Zealand (RIANZ) which carried out industry advocacy functions (such as Government representation), administration of the NZ Music Awards and, in 1975, production of The Official NZ Music Charts which listed albums for the first time. For better administrational efficiency, the two companies were merged in 2013 and renamed to Recorded Music NZ.

== Aotearoa Music Awards ==
The Aotearoa Music Awards (AMA) are conferred annually by Recorded Music NZ for outstanding artistic and technical achievements in the recording field. The Awards are one of the biggest accolades a group or artist can receive in music in New Zealand. The Awards have been presented annually since 1965.

Separately, Recorded Music NZ also funds a cash prize that is awarded to the winner of the Taite Music Prize, which is administered by Independent Music New Zealand. In 2024 the prize was $12,500.

== Official Aotearoa Music Charts ==
The Official Aotearoa Music Charts (previously known as the Official New Zealand Music Chart) are the weekly New Zealand top forty singles and albums charts, issued weekly by Recorded Music NZ (previously known as RIANZ). The chart also includes the Top 40 Hot Singles chart, the Top 20 New Zealand singles and albums, the Top 20 Hot New Zealand singles, and Top 10 compilation albums. All charts are compiled from data of both physical and digital sales from music retailers in New Zealand.

== Piracy ==
As RIANZ, Recorded Music NZ was instrumental in attempting to introduce a possible version of Section 92A Copyright Act. The amendment would have required ISPs in New Zealand to disconnect users accused but not convicted of downloading copyrighted material; the first law of its type in the world. The amendment and consequently the RIANZ's actions have been widely criticised. ISPs described the law as "a deeply flawed law that undermines the fundamental rights and simply will not work", while thousands of artists have joined the Campaign for Fair Copyright voicing their "disappointment" at the RIANZ stance. However, the version was ultimately dropped, and Section 92A of the Copyright Act has now been replaced by Section 122A the Copyright (Infringing File Sharing) Amendment Act 2011 which came in force from 1 September 2011.

== See also ==
- List of best-selling albums in New Zealand
- Music of New Zealand
