= Copyright (Infringing File Sharing) Amendment Act 2011 =

New Zealand Parliament
- Royal assent: 18 April 2011
- Commenced: 1 September 2011

Amended by
- Copyright Act 1994
- Status: Current legislation

The Copyright (Infringing File Sharing) Amendment Act 2011 is an Act of the Parliament of New Zealand which amends the Copyright Act 1994.

The law became known informally as "Skynet" after National MP Jonathan Young compared the Internet to Skynet, the artificial intelligence network from the Terminator franchise, in the parliamentary debates on the then bill.

== Legislative history ==
The Copyright (Infringing File Sharing) Amendment Bill 2010, or Bill 119–1, was introduced to parliament on 23 February 2010. The Bill had its first reading and was referred to Commerce Committee on 22 April 2010. On 3 November 2010 the Commerce Committee reported on the Bill, then Bill 119–2. On 12 April 2011 the Bill had its second reading, committee of the whole House and third reading. The Bill received royal assent on 18 April 2011 and became an Act of Parliament.

The Bill was passed "under urgency".

== Amendments to Copyright Act 1994 ==
The Copyright (Infringing File Sharing) Amendment Act 2011 repeals section 92A of the Copyright Act 1994. Section 92A was enacted by section 53 of the Copyright (New Technologies and Performers Rights) Amendment Act 2008 and would have required Internet service providers (ISPs) to adopt a process for disconnecting the internet access of subscribers suspected of repeat copyright infringement. Section 92A was criticised by civil liberty groups, academics and lawyers. As a result of the controversy, section 92A was repealed.

== Graduated response provisions ==
The Copyright (Infringing File Sharing) Amendment Act 2011 provides for what is known as graduated response. Under the Act copyright owners notify fixed-line ISPs (the Act does not apply to mobile networks until 2013) that they believe an internet subscriber is infringing their copyright through peer-to-peer filesharing, the ISPs in turn send warning notices to the relevant subscribers, and after three such warnings the copyright owner may take their case to the Copyright Tribunal. The Copyright Tribunal can impose a maximum $15,000 penalty on the Internet subscriber. The Act has extended the jurisdiction of the Copyright Tribunal for this purpose and the stated aim of the Act is to provide a "fast track, low cost process" to deal with allegations of copyright infringement through peer-to-peer filesharing.

When the Bill was originally introduced to parliament it provided that a District Court could order the disconnection of internet subscribers for up to six months in certain circumstances. This provision has been amended and the new section 122PA provides that internet subscribers can not be disconnected until an Order in Council is made by the Governor General on the recommendation of the Justice Minister. It is anticipated that disconnection of internet subscribers will be considered in 2013, as part of the five-year review of the amendments to the Copyright Act 1994 made in 2008.

== Criticism ==
A rapporteur for the UN argued that "three strikes" laws that deprive alleged copyright infringers of Internet access violate human rights. Sweden made remarks at the UN Human Rights Council that endorsed many of the report's findings, including the criticism of "three strikes" rules. The statement was signed by 40 other nations, including the United States and Canada. The United Kingdom and France, two nations that have enacted "three strikes" regimes, did not sign the statement.

On 27 August 2011, protesters demonstrated against the Act in Auckland.

On 23 July 2012, despite the policy intent of making the issuance of copyright infringement notices under the legislation inexpensive, Telecom New Zealand revealed that under the new regime, it had cost them $534,416 to issue only 1,238 notices - or approximately $438 per notice, although this cost figure is not evidenced by any audited breakdown. The copyright holders are required to pay a fee of $25 to have the notices issued.

== Supporters ==
The graduated response as implemented by the Copyright (Infringing File Sharing) Amendment Act 2011 was not supported by the New Zealand Federation Against Copyright Theft (NZFACT) as they allege that Internet Protocol Address Providers (i.e. internet service providers) grossly exaggerated the fees required to handle the notices. They argued that existing civil and criminal provisions for copyright infringement are ineffective.

== See also ==
- Copyright law of New Zealand
