= Xero =

Accounting software company

Xero Limited
- Type: Public
- Traded as: ASX: XRO; S&P/ASX 200 component
- ISIN: NZXROE0001S2
- Industry: Software as a service
- Founded: July 6, 2006; 20 years ago in Wellington, New Zealand
- Founders: Rod Drury; Hamish Edwards
- Headquarters: Wellington, New Zealand
- Key people: David Thodey (chair of the board); Sukhinder Singh Cassidy (CEO)
- Products: Accounting software
- Revenue: ▲NZ$2.753 billion (2026)
- Operating income: ▼NZ$316.1 million (2026)
- Net income: ▼NZ$167.4 million (2026)
- Total assets: ▲NZ$9.097 billion (2026)
- Total equity: ▲NZ$5.404 billion (2026)
- Number of employees: ▲5,114 (2026)
- Website: xero.com

Xero Limited is a New Zealand technology company that provides cloud-based accounting software for small businesses. The company has offices in New Zealand, Australia, the United Kingdom, the United States, Canada, South Africa and Singapore. Xero's products are based on the software-as-a-service model and sold by subscription, based on the type and number of entities managed by the subscriber. The products are used in over 180 countries.

== History ==
On July 6, 2006, Xero was founded by Rod Drury and Hamish Edwards in Wellington, where Xero Limited's headquarters are still located. The company was originally called Accounting 2.0.

Xero listed on the New Zealand Exchange in June 2007, raising NZ$15 million in its IPO.

During its early international expansion, Xero raised capital from investors including MYOB co-founder Craig Winkler, Peter Thiel's Valar Ventures, Matrix Capital Management and Accel Partners.

In November 2012, Xero also listed on the Australian Securities Exchange (ASX), while retaining its NZX listing.

By 2017, Xero had more than one million customers globally, and the following year, it had more than one million subscribers in Australia and New Zealand. In April 2018, Steve Vamos was appointed as CEO, replacing Rod Drury who remained on the board as a non-executive director until 2023. Vamos announced in November 2022 that he would step down in February 2023 and be replaced by Sukhinder Singh Cassidy, a former executive of Google and StubHub.

Xero delisted from the New Zealand Exchange in February 2018 and consolidated its shares on the Australian Securities Exchange, which became its sole stock exchange listing.

In 2019, the company announced it had over two million global subscribers, and three million subscribers in September 2021.

In March 2023, Sukhinder Singh Cassidy, the CEO of Xero, announced the removal of 700-800 roles across Xero, representing approximately 15% of the employee base. At this time, the company reportedly had more than 3.5 million subscribers and about 4,500 staff across offices in New Zealand, Australia, North America, the UK and southeast Asia. The company announced it had finished its job cuts by November 2023, reducing headcount to 4,242 staff.

In June 2025, Xero announced an agreement to acquire Melio, a New York-based payments provider, for $2.5 billion.

== Products ==
The Xero accounting software uses a single unified ledger, which allows users to work in the same set of books regardless of location or operating system. It provides automatic bank feeds, invoicing, accounts payable, expense claims, fixed asset depreciation, purchase orders, bank reconciliations, and standard business and management reporting.

In 2011 and 2012, the Xero Touch mobile apps for iOS and Android devices were released.

In the 2019 financial year, Xero offered services relating to Making Tax Digital in the United Kingdom, Single Touch Payroll in Australia, and Payday Filing in New Zealand.

In 2026 Xero announced a partnership with Anthropic to add AI to their accounting software.

== Acquisitions and partnerships ==
In July 2011, Xero acquired the Australian online payroll provider Paycycle for a mixture of cash and shares totaling NZ$1.9 million, to integrate the company's products into its services. It acquired Spotlight Workpapers in July 2012 for a mixture of cash and shares totaling $800,000.

In July 2018, Xero formed a partnership with US payroll platform Gusto. In August 2018, it acquired Hubdoc, a data capture application. In November 2018, it acquired cloud-based accounts preparation and tax filing application Instafile for £5.25 million.

In August 2020, Xero acquired Waddle, an Australian-based invoice financing startup, for A$80 million. The payment included $31 million in cash and $49 million in earnout payments. Waddle allows small businesses to access loans secured by their accounts receivables. In March 2023, Xero announced it was cutting jobs and closing the Waddle app.

In November 2021, it acquired inventory management provider Locate Inventory for US$19 million, and in December 2021, Xero announced it was acquiring Canadian tax software provider, TaxCycle, for CA$75 million.

In November 2022, Xero announced the establishment of a technology base in India in partnership with technology outsourcing company Infosys. The India technology base includes engineering and developer roles.

In April 2024, Xero announced a strategic partnership with workforce management platform Deputy. As part of the agreement, Xero invested US$25 million to take a minority stake in Deputy and announced plans to embed Deputy’s shift work management capabilities into Xero’s payroll platform for Australian customers.

In September 2024, Xero announced the acquisition of cloud-based reporting, insights and analytics platform Syft Analytics for up to US$70 million.

In June 2025, Xero agreed to acquire US company Melio for US$2.5 billion in cash and stock, and up to $500 million in additional payments over three years. Melio co-founder and CEO Matan Bar was announced as leading the US operations of the combined business. The acquisition was completed on 15 October 2025.

== See also ==
- Comparison of accounting software
