= Copyright law of New Zealand =

The copyright law of New Zealand is covered by the Copyright Act 1994 and subsequent amendments. It is administered by Business Law Policy Unit of the Ministry of Business, Innovation and Employment (MBIE). In June 2017, a review of the existing legislation was announced.

New Zealand is party to several international copyright agreements, including the TRIPS Agreement 1994, the Berne Convention 1928 and the Universal Copyright Convention 1952.

== Scope of copyright ==
The Copyright Act 1994 provides owners of original work with a monopoly to control the use and dissemination of their work. The owner of the copyright in a work has the exclusive right to exploit the economic rights. A person infringes copyright in a work when he or she, other than pursuant to a copyright licence, does any of the following "restricted acts", either in relation to the work as a whole or any "substantial part" of it:

- copying the work
- publishing, issuing or selling copies to the public
- performing, playing or showing the work in public
- broadcasting the work
- making any work derived or adapted from the copyright work

Anyone who wants to use someone else's work requires the permission of the right owner. The copyright owner can assign, transfer, and license the economic rights in the work.

== Copyright works ==
Copyright automatically applies (no registration required) to original works in the following categories:

- Literary works (novels, poems, song lyrics, computer programming/programmes, compilations of data)
- Dramatic works (scripts for films or plays)
- Artistic works (paintings, plans, maps, photographs, sculptures, models, buildings)
- Musical works (scores and arrangements)
- Sound recordings (of musical, literary or dramatic works)
- Films
- Broadcasts (radio, TV, cable)
- Typographical arrangement of published editions (this exists independent of copyright in the published work, if any)

Copyright does not apply to certain government works, such as Acts of Parliament, Regulations, Parliamentary debates, Court judgments and reports of Select Committees, Royal Commissions, Commissions of Inquiry, etc.

== Copyright term ==
Copyright protection does not last forever. The duration of copyright protection depends on the type of work. The work will eventually be out of copyright (there is no concept of public domain in New Zealand legislation). This means that once copyright has expired, everyone can freely use the work. Before such time permission of the rights holder is required to use a copyrighted work. New Zealand's copyright term is largely consistent with other countries, and complies with the WIPO standard. The copyright term depends on the type of work in question. Here are some examples:

- Literary, dramatic, musical and artistic works: 50 years from the death of the author
- Sound recordings and films: 50 years from when it is available to the public
- Broadcasts and cable: 50 years from broadcast
- Typographical arrangements: 25 years from first publishing
- Computer-generated work: 50 years after being made
- Crown copyright: 100 years
- Artistic works industrially applied: 16 years from when the work is applied
- Artistic craftsmanship industrially applied: 25 years from when the work is applied

In October 2021, the New Zealand government reached a free trade agreement with the United Kingdom. This agreement includes a provision to extend the copyright term by 20 years for authors, performers and producers to be implemented within 15 years.

== Exclusions and fair dealing ==
The Copyright Act allows for certain permitted acts to be exempted from copyright restrictions. These include:

- fair dealing for the purpose of criticism, review, news reporting, research or private study
- certain educational purposes
- time shifting of TV programmes for viewing at a later time
- format shifting of music
- back up of computer programs
- braille copies of literary or dramatic works

== Moral rights ==
Besides protecting the economic rights of the author, copyright law also protects the moral rights of an author. Moral rights protect the author from distortion, mutilation or other modification of the work where that act would be or is prejudicial to the reputation of the author. Moral rights are inalienably attached to the author and cannot be transferred. Some moral rights can, however, be waived. Moral rights give the author for instance the right to:

- be identified as the author (right of attribution)
- object to derogatory treatment of the work (right of integrity)
- not have work falsely attributed to them

== New technologies amendments ==
In 2001, the Ministry of Economic Development initiated a major review of copyright law, in light of new technologies, such as media in digital form and communications via the internet. Law changes were enacted in 2008, most notably the Copyright (New Technologies) Amendment Act. These changes were influenced by media corporations and aligned organisations (RIANZ, APRA, Artists Alliance, NZSA, AIPA, NZIPP, etc.), but opposed by New Zealand artists, technology specialists, ISPs, businesses, media commentators, librarians and members of the public. The nature of the law changes attracted attention internationally. Prime Minister John Key stated that the stronger copyright laws, including the controversial section 92a, were required for New Zealand to be able to negotiate a free trade agreement with the United States.

In February 2010, a Bill repealing section 92a of the Act was introduced to parliament, replacing it with a three notice regime for copyright infringement via file sharing. The bill also provides for the Copyright Tribunal to hear complaints and award penalties of up to $15,000. The notice regime took effect on 1 September 2011.

In 2013, the Copyright Tribunal decided 17 cases pertaining to illegal file sharing. In all 17 cases, the applicant was the Recording Industry Association of New Zealand (RIANZ) taking action on behalf of the copyright holders against individual Internet account holders. None of the account holders were infringing on a commercial scale for profit. In most cases the infringement concerned the uploading of music using BitTorrent file-sharing protocols.

== See also ==
- Freedom of panorama in New Zealand
- List of countries' copyright length
- Anti-Counterfeiting Trade Agreement
- New Zealand Internet Blackout
- Pirate Party of New Zealand
