= Trade Me =

New Zealand auction website

- Company type: Private
- Available in: English
- Headquarters: Wellington (main office), Auckland, and Christchurch, New Zealand
- Country of origin: New Zealand
- Area served: New Zealand
- Owner: Apax Partners
- Founder: Sam Morgan
- Key people: Anders Skoe (CEO)
- Employees: 600
- Website: www.trademe.co.nz
- Commercial: Yes
- Launched: 1999
- Current status: Active

Trade Me is New Zealand's largest online auction and classifieds website. Managed by Trade Me Ltd., the site was founded in 1999 by New Zealand entrepreneur Sam Morgan, who sold it to Fairfax in 2006 for NZ$700 million. Trade Me was publicly listed as a separate entity on 13 December 2011 under the ticker "TME". In May 2019, Trade Me was acquired by private equity firm Apax Partners for NZ$2.56 billion. Trade Me Ltd also operates several sister websites including FindSomeone and Holiday Houses.

As of 20 March 2019, Trade Me's website was the fifth most visited in New Zealand and was ranked 2,711th globally according to Alexa Internet. In a country with a population of 5.3 million, the Trade Me site has, as of April 2021, 5 million active members. As of April 2021, an average of 690,000 people visit the site each day.

Participating traders primarily use New Zealand's banking system to settle payments, although Trade Me offers sellers the ability to accept credit card payments via Trade Me's own instant payment service, Ping (formerly Pay Now). Australian sellers must have a New Zealand bank account, while sellers from other countries are not allowed on the site without special approval.

Trade Me shares many features with other online auction websites, such as eBay. Some of these features include "Buy Now" and "Auto bidding". Sellers may choose to block the large proportion of members not "authenticated" from bidding. Only "authenticated" members can ask sellers questions. Members can become "authenticated" by using a credit/debit card on-site or depositing some money in their Trade Me account.

Only one membership per private person is allowed. Membership is for life, is never deleted and will be only partially deactivated if a member "closes" their membership by giving three days notice in writing to Trade Me. Member profile, bidding history and "feedback received" pages are then hidden and can be reactivated by ex-members at a later date on request. All ex-members empty member "items for sale" pages and all the "feedback sent" posted on other members pages is not hidden.

== History ==
=== Origins and early development ===
A former Trade Me logo from October 1999

Sam Morgan founded Trade Me in 1999, constructing the site while working full-time for Deloitte as a technology consultant. Within Deloitte, Morgan worked on Internet projects and supply-chain issues. During this time he witnessed the successes of online businesses like eBay and Yahoo, as well as the disasters of the dot-com bubble.

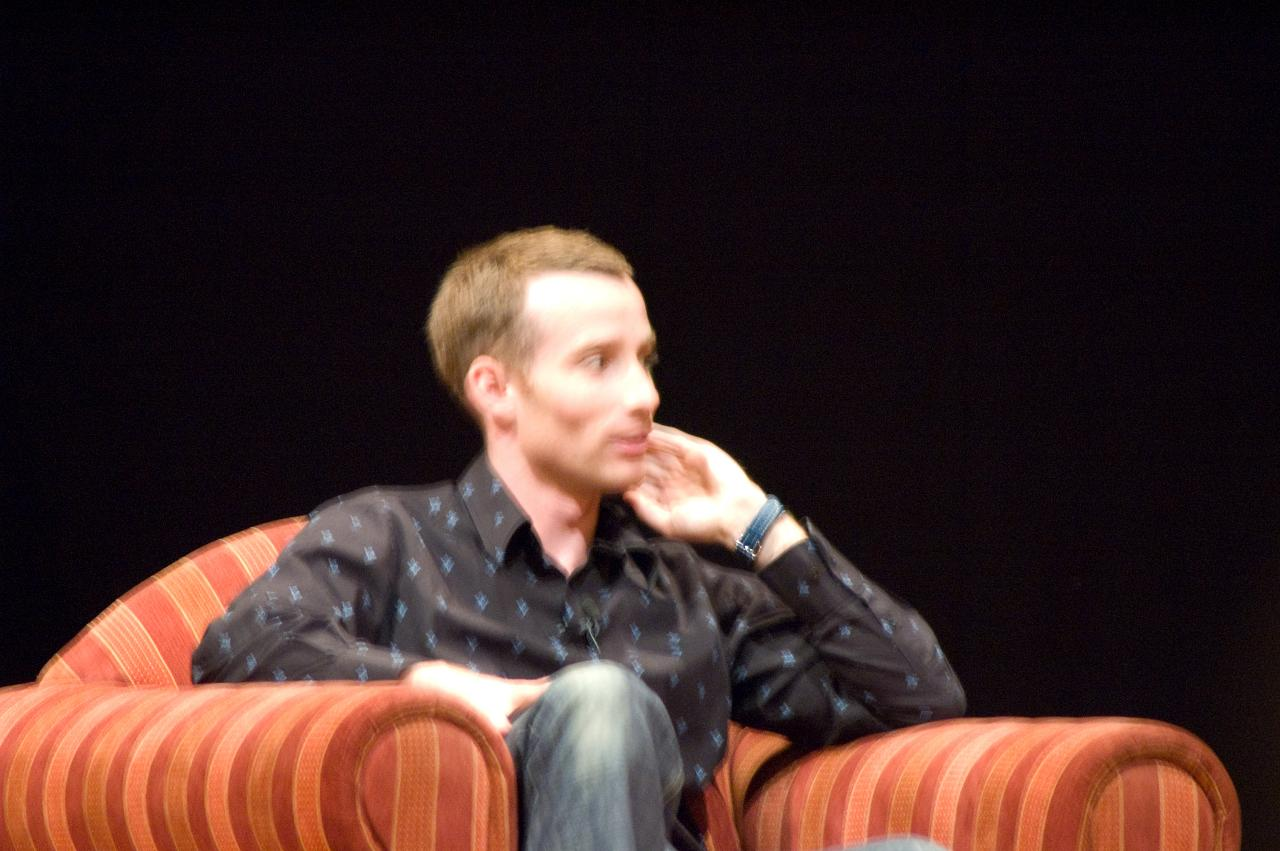
Trade Me founder Sam Morgan at Webstock 2008

According to Trade Me legend, Morgan, then 23 years old, decided to found the Trade Me site when, despite searching online, he could not find a secondhand heater for his flat in Wellington. The Trade & Exchange site had a heater for sale, but held back listings for a week before publishing them online, and by the time Morgan made contact with the heater's owner, the item in question had already sold.

Morgan describes the initial designing and building of Trade Me thus:

"Some time later we were in a backpackers in Sydney and got evicted because it was overbooked. We went up to some backwater because it was the only accommodation we could find. Anyway, there was nothing to do, so that night I started drawing a data model. So it sort of started there really. Then when I came back to Wellington I literally sat on the couch and built the site on a laptop over a five- or six-week period."

The site went online in March 1999 after Morgan pulled together as much funding as he could. It gained 155 members in its first week on the Internet. In its early stages Morgan humorously listed Trade Me for sale on eBay with a $1 million buy-now price. Though eBay withdrew Morgan's auction, the prank sparked some interest among New Zealanders who realised the potential of online trading.

Trade Me developed slowly initially, because its founder had little funding to pay for the costs of hosting and of expanding the site. In addition, Trade Me initially offered a completely free service for both buyers and sellers, a strategy for expanding its member base at the cost of short-term revenue. With little money and time available to work on the site, Morgan made the critical decision to sell almost half of his new company to his former Deloitte colleagues, bringing him around $75,000.

By August 1999 membership had risen to 3,500, and Morgan could dedicate most of his time and funding to the site. The early strategy for Trade Me involved simply increasing its user base and encouraging members to refer their friends to the site. Trade Me launched the Safe Trader escrow service about this time.

=== Growth and expansion ===
In its early years Trade Me continued to struggle, slowly increasing its user base, but facing financial challenges. The site initially used web banners, but falling prices for advertising made web-banner revenue insufficient to cover expenses. Trade Me then introduced fees for auction services: first for features such as bold titles; then in September 2000 it introduced "success fees". This action proved the turning point for Trade Me, saving the site from potential financial disaster. Much of the success to come was based around the 'Trade Me Manifesto', a series of ten values for keeping the site fast and the company technology focused.

eBay tried to enter the New Zealand market in 2001, but had little success. Trade Me has remained the major Internet-auction site in New Zealand, with both international and smaller national competitors gaining relatively little market penetration. Morgan commented on eBay's attempt to penetrate the New Zealand market in an interview:

"...I think there are big cultural issues there that are just not well understood. For example the Americans think that everyone has a zip code [...] they were a little late in and then they launched in US dollars."

Morgan took time off from the stress of running the booming Trade Me site in September 2001, and went to the United Kingdom to manage an IT team in London. When he returned to his role at Trade Me the site had become profitable, with a membership of 100,000 and growing. By April 2005, this number reached one million.

In August 2003, Trade Me went live with Trade Me Motors and Trade Me Property followed in 2005 along with Trade Me Jobs in 2006.

New Zealand's Deloitte/Unlimited Fast 50 rated Trade Me the fastest-growing NZ technology company in 2005.

=== Fairfax subsidiary, 2006–2012 ===
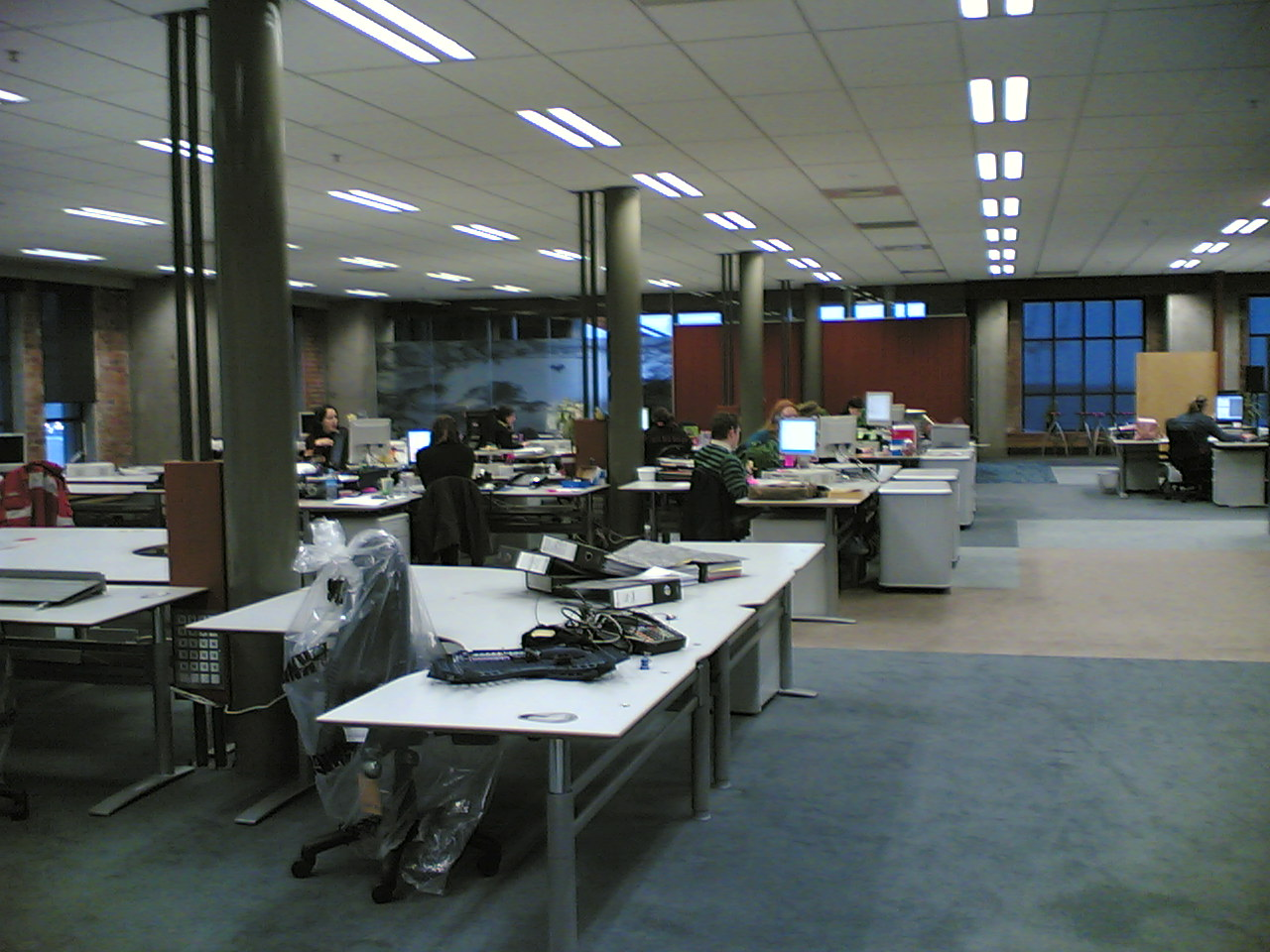
Trade Me offices, Wellington, 2006.

On 6 March 2006, the Australian media company Fairfax acquired Trade Me in a deal worth NZ$700 million, with an additional NZ$50 million payable if the organisation met earnings targets over the next two years. (Those targets were met.) Sam Morgan and other executives remained with Trade Me. Since the Fairfax purchase, Trade Me has continued to stand alone, with the former Fairfax NZ sites Jobstuff and Propertystuff being discontinued in favour of the Trade Me offerings.

In December 2012, Fairfax announced it was looking to sell off its stake in Trade Me in order to pay off debts. The sale was confirmed on 17 December. Its first profit report following the sale exceeded expectations, at NZ$37.4 million in the second half of 2012.

=== Apax Partners, 2018–present ===
In December 2018, Trade Me accepted a NZ$2.56 billion takeover bid from the British investment company Apax Partners, marking the biggest private equity deal in New Zealand's history. This acquisition deal was finalised in May 2019.

On 3 June 2025, Trade Me acquired a 50 percent stake in media company Stuff's Stuff Digital division, which consists of the Stuff.co.nz website and evening news bulletin ThreeNews. In addition, Stuff's property section will be rebranded as Trade Me Property, with listings, advertisements and some content shared across both platforms.

In early March 2026, Trade Me announced that it would be eliminating success fees for casual sellers in order to compete with Facebook Marketplace. Trade Me had a policy of deducting 7.9% of the final sales price for items sold on their platform. In addition, the company confirmed plans to phase out online bank transfers while offering cash payment options, its own online Ping payment service, and the Afterpay debt installment service. Buyers would also be charged a progressive service fee based on the purchase price for items worth more than $20.

== Listings ==
Trade Me has increased its scope over time, and now offers a wide range of listing possibilities. Customers can list the following items and positions on Trade Me:

- General items
- Motors: cars, motorbikes and boats
- Property
- Jobs
- Rental property
- Flatmates wanted
- Antiques & Collectables
- Pets And Animals

== Community and related sites ==
Trade Me sites include:

- Trade Me – the main Trade Me auction site
- FindSomeone – a matchmaking/dating site
- Holiday Houses – booking holiday homes/baches – rental accommodation
- MotorWeb – vehicle licence plate lookup and basic facts site

=== Discontinued sites ===
Old Friends logo

- The online map site smaps, which provided access to New Zealand street maps, was closed in December 2008, leaving the niche to sites like Google Maps
- Old Friends – finding old school friends and workmates – discontinued in January 2016
- SafeTrader – escrow service for Trade Me auctions - discontinued in July 2017

== Controversy ==
As a fairly open marketplace which is recognised globally, Trade Me experiences the same problems (such as fraudsters), and users need to exercise vigilance. In 2007, Trade Me set up a dedicated Trust & Safety team who monitor the site seven days a week to keep its members safe.

"Members can report listings that may be in breach of the Terms and Conditions" via the "Community Watch" (CW) badge, sited at the bottom of every listing. Contact with staff can also be made via the 'Contact Us' link at the bottom of every page. Social media can also be used to contact Trade Me.

To minimise payment problems and reduce fraud, Trade Me restricted membership to residents of New Zealand and Australia in 2005. This affected around 20,000 international members. However, in September 2013 Trade Me announced that it had "opened up its borders" and now has "a few internationally based sellers trading on the site," but that "only international sellers who meet our requirements for selling from overseas are allowed to do so."

Trade Me's terms and conditions restrict membership to persons over eighteen years of age, as any user under the age of eighteen can not negotiate a legally binding contract. Prior to 2005 Trade Me did not restrict underage users, even allowing them to enter in their correct birthdates upon sign-up. In June 2005 Fair Go, a television programme devoted to consumer affairs, approached Trade Me Limited regarding this issue and featured the matter on a broadcast episode. In response to this, Trade Me Limited sent all the users who registered their date of birth as under eighteen an e-mail asking them to check and update their details if incorrect. Trade Me no longer allows users to register if they enter a birth date indicating their age as under eighteen, but people under eighteen may simply represent themselves as older when they join.

=== Clashes with rivals ===
Trade Me Property logo 2010.

In 2006, Trade Me laid a complaint with the Advertising Standards Authority (ASA) over the advertising of its largest property market competitor, Realestate.co.nz. According to the complaint, Realestate.co.nz, (run jointly by the Real Estate Institute of New Zealand (REINZ) and Property Page Ltd) had misled consumers with their advertisements with their slogan: "the only place with every place". Trade Me stated that it had properties listed on the Trade Me website that Realestate.co.nz did not have. Trade Me also detailed other reasons why Realestate.co.nz had allegedly breached the ASA's code of ethics and comparative advertising. The ASA upheld parts of the complaint.

On 6 November 2008, Lixtor accused Trade Me of using bullying tactics. Trade Me said Lixtor was just trying to draw media attention.

On 20 November 2008, a community newspaper The Aucklander also reported that Trade Me's lawyers asked Lixtor to remove their "Terms and Conditions"

On 3 February 2009, in the wake of the emerging New Zealand copyright law Section 92a, New Zealand Creative Freedom Foundation published an article. It was stated that Lixtor vs. Trade Me case is a good example of how the new section 92a in the New Zealand copyright law could be "misused" if passed.

=== Clashes with software developers ===
Various software developers have received legal threats after developing third-party software which interfaces with the Trade Me website.

On 19 August 2006 the New Zealand Listener published an article, "Bidding War" on one such developer. The developer, Ciaran Riddell, created a piece of software, AuctionBar, which used a technique known as screen scraping. The software allowed for more detailed searches for goods on sale as well as bids and updates via text-messaging and a tool known as a "sniper", which acted as an automated bidding tool.

Trade Me have since amended the "Terms and Conditions" of the Trade Me website which now specifies "You may not use a robot, spider, scraper or other automated means to access the Website or information featured on it for any purpose" under s4.1(c).

On 7 May 2007, Trade Me released a Windows Vista Sidebar Gadget to run in the Windows Sidebar. This gadget, available on the Trade Me site, became the first sanctioned application to work with Trade Me. As the Vista Gadget requires an XML Feed, the gadget caused further discussion in the developer community about why TradeMe did not have an API. It also led to other creations by the developer community on top of Vista Gadget.

Trade Me has now released an official API.

== Notable auctions ==
=== Most popular auctions ===
As of July 2013, the most popular auctions were as follows:

Rank	Views	Closed	Item
1	1.1m	3 June 2006	Wellington Hurricanes player Tana Umaga hit teammate Chris Masoe with a Roxy handbag at the "Jolly Poacher" bar in Christchurch after Masoe got into an altercation with a patron. The owner of the bag auctioned it via TradeMe for $22,750, generating a large media story and over 1 million page views before the auction closed.
2	1m	10 July 2013	A printer which was stated to be faulty and 'possessed' was listed by nickftward to be on sale. He used quite a lot of humour and sarcasm to describe it, which made the auction more fun. His description: "Words cannot express how much I hate this printer. It never works when I need it to - it's like it knows when I have to urgently print something. It randomly decides if it wants to work wirelessly or not. And scanning wirelessly? Forget about it! When you first turn it on it will play an endless symphony of sounds that are simply there to fool you into thinking that it might actually do what it's designed to do. Don't be fooled. This thing is evil incarnate." The winner of the auction was kornholio, with a winning bid of $280 ($1 Reserve Price)
3	810,802	18 June 2009	Mike Whittaker (mikew4) listed his old Kelvinator washing machine under the title 'Scary Washing Machine' due to its behaviour when washing. He created a fictional story about how it sucked his shoes, pants, iron and wife into a vortex, beyond which, there are dinosaurs. The pictures he drew of the supposed dinosaurs are being sold as fundraisers for NZ charities. T-shirt company 'MrVintage' has created its own Scary Washing Machine Range of men's and women's T-shirts. The washing machine eventually sold for $5,160.
4	459,420	1 August 2012	The implosion of Radio Network House on 5 August 2012 was New Zealand's first ever controlled building demolition by explosives. Like most other buildings in the Christchurch Central City, Radio Network House was damaged beyond repair in the 22 February 2011 Christchurch earthquake. The right to push the button for the implosion was put up for auction and became the auction with the third highest page views ever. The winning bid was for $26,000 and the consortium of demolition contractors let the Child Cancer Foundation nominate a six-year-old boy from Queenstown.
5	355,889	20 January 2012	YOUR Tattoo on my Bum!!
6	384,705	24 May 2009	Buy a Tractor and get a 20-acre farm for free. Southland couple Allan & Shelly Holland have ensured that whoever bought their tractor got a little extra to boot. The International 574 was just a regular old tractor – bucket, back blade, red – but it did come with one rather unusual added feature: a farm, the 8.1h block in the Catlins was an added bonus for whoever wins the tractor auction.
7	316,350	7 March 2011	Landscape Rocks for Sale in ChCh (following the February 2011 Christchurch earthquake, there was no shortage of rocks, as whole cliffs had collapsed)
8	292,184	6 May 2010	Folden 2010
9	276,094	8 January 2009	Jesus Christ Pita Bread
10	258,775	9 January 2012	Two days in the studio and advice from Neil Finn

=== Other popular auctions ===
- A "comfort hug", auctioned in April 2005 to promote love and good feelings. The auction received considerable media attention.
- In late 2005, a member offered a "time machine" for sale through auction (or swap for an "anti gravity machine"), with the highest bid reaching $300,000,000,001,999. The seller withdrew the auction shortly before its close time. News of the auction reached some New Zealand newspapers, which ran a story on it. This auction used to hold the record for the highest number of questions asked and answered.
- In 2006 a user attempted to auction the Optus B1 satellite following a malfunction. The opening price started at NZ$200,000,000. Trade Me withdrew the auction after 231,908-page views.
- In May 2006 a member tried to sell Australia, using humorous descriptions of the country. The auction drew over 100 questions, and had more than 11,000 views. The country achieved a bid of $200,045,400, with a reserve price of 50 cents. In the end however, Trade Me administrators withdrew the auction. One News (a broadcast television programme) ran a report on this auction.
- Also in May 2006 a member tried to sell his leg, which had been amputated a year earlier as a result of diabetes. Trade Me withdrew the auction within hours and swiftly added "Body Parts" to the "Prohibited Items" list.
- In June 2006 Lisa Lewis streaked across the field at the All Blacks game against Ireland held at Waikato Stadium. Days later the bikini Lewis had worn ended up for auction. The winning bid of $4,010 later proved not genuine
- In October 2007 Lisa-Marie Corlet stumbled across a pebble with markings allegedly resembling the Virgin Mary. A first auction completed, but the bids later proved invalid. Corlet went on a nationwide television programme, Campbell Live, to announce she would not accept anything less than NZ$78,662,500,000 as she believes that someone would very much treasure the item. She said she was non-religious and offered this as the reason why she chose to on-sell the pebble. It was one of the most highly viewed auctions on Trade Me, with over 100,000 views, but the pebble failed to sell.
- On 17 November 2008 Lixtor attempted to auction their auction site following dispute with Trade Me over copyright-infringement allegations. The opening price started at NZ$100,000,000. Trade Me withdrew the auction after a few hours.
- February 2010: The Trade Me user rhorne listed a lemon; with the letters "XT" printed vividly upon it; for sale with a humorous description. This was designed to mock the XT Mobile Network due to its intermittent outages (which caused significant inconvenience to customers and delayed emergency service responses) and other flaws. There were some suggestions made on the auction that the proceeds should be donated to charity, however the seller made it clear that was not his intention. The auction sold for $1,155.
- In February 2012, Labour MP Trevor Mallard was accused of ticket scalping on Trade Me when he sold four tickets to the Homegrown music festival for a $246 profit. The MP had in 2006 initiated legislation, the Major Events Management Act 2007, prohibiting ticket scalping for major events (although Homegrown wasn't classified as a "major event" so wasn't covered). He later offered to refund the money he received for the tickets.
- In 2019, one of the last single-use plastic bags from Pak n' Save was sold just before the law changed to ban them. The auction had considerable media attention and was the fourth most viewed listing of the year, selling for $52.
- A bag of Covid-free air was the most viewed auction of 2020. The seller listed the bag to commemorate a negative Covid test during the pandemic. The listing fetched 210,086 views.
- In 2021, YouTuber David Jones auctioned a cardboard Lamborghini replica on Trade Me to raise funds for Auckland's Starship Children's Hospital. The auction raised NZ$10,420, with all proceeds donated to the hospital. The listing received 211,670 views, making it one of Trade Me's most viewed listings of 2021.

Note: Withdrawn auctions become unviewable after 60 days and bid histories after 45.

== Notable people ==
- Sam Morgan, founder
- Gareth Morgan, investor

== See also ==
- Internet in New Zealand
