= Fingerboard (skateboard) =

Miniature skateboard controlled by the fingers

A fingerboard is a scaled-down replica of a skateboard or snowboard that a person uses with their fingers, rather than their feet.

A fingerboard is typically 96 millimeters (3.8 in) long with width ranging from 26 to 36 mm (1.0 to 1.4 in), with graphics, trucks and plastic ball-bearing wheels, like a skateboard. A fingerboard can be used to do traditional skateboarding tricks, such as an ollie and kickflip.

== History ==
Fingerboards first existed as homemade finger toys in the late 1960s and later became a novelty attached to keychains in many skate shops.

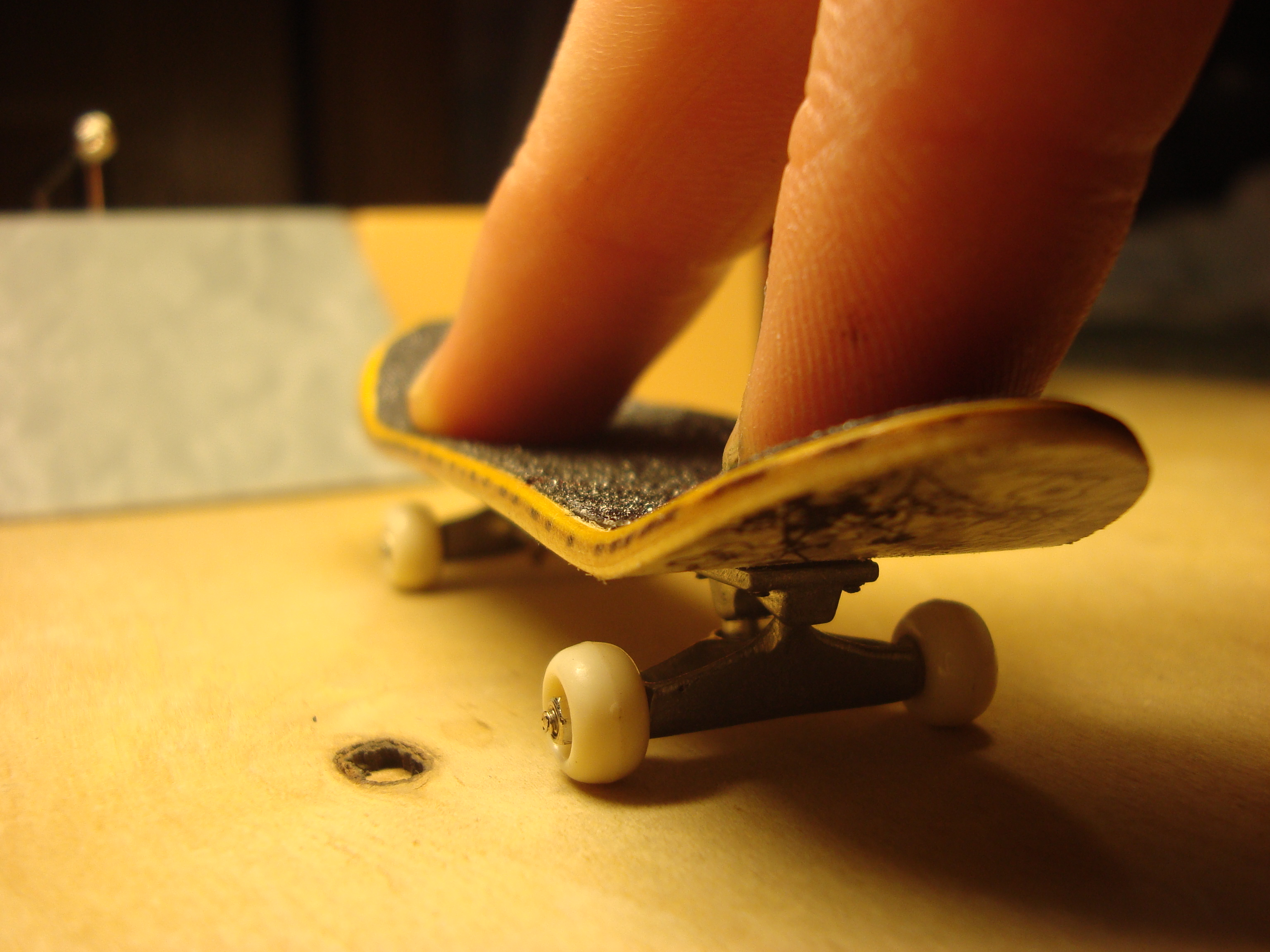
A fingerboard approaching a ramp

In the 1985 Powell-Peralta skateboarding video titled "Future Primitive," Lance Mountain brought fingerboarding to the skateboarders of the world. Around the same time, Mountain wrote an article on how to make fingerboards in TransWorld SKATEboarding magazine. In the video, Lance Mountain rode a homemade fingerboard in a double-bin sink. It is widely accepted that this is where the idea for the ramp found in The Search for Animal Chin came from. Some consider this the earliest fingerboard footage available for public viewing. That homemade fingerboard was built from wood, tubes, and toy train axles.

The first company to mass-produce fingerboards that weren't intended to be used with a figurine or accessories was Somerville International's Fingerboard brand. They were also the first to include licensed graphics from actual skateboard graphics with the introduction of the Pro-Precision board.

Although fingerboarding was a novelty within the skateboarding industry for years, skateboarding reached wider popularity in the late 1990s. Toy fingerboards became an inexpensive novelty toy and high-end collectible, complete with accessories one would find in use with standard-size skateboards. Fingerboards are used by skateboarders as 3-D model visual aids to understand potential tricks and maneuvers.

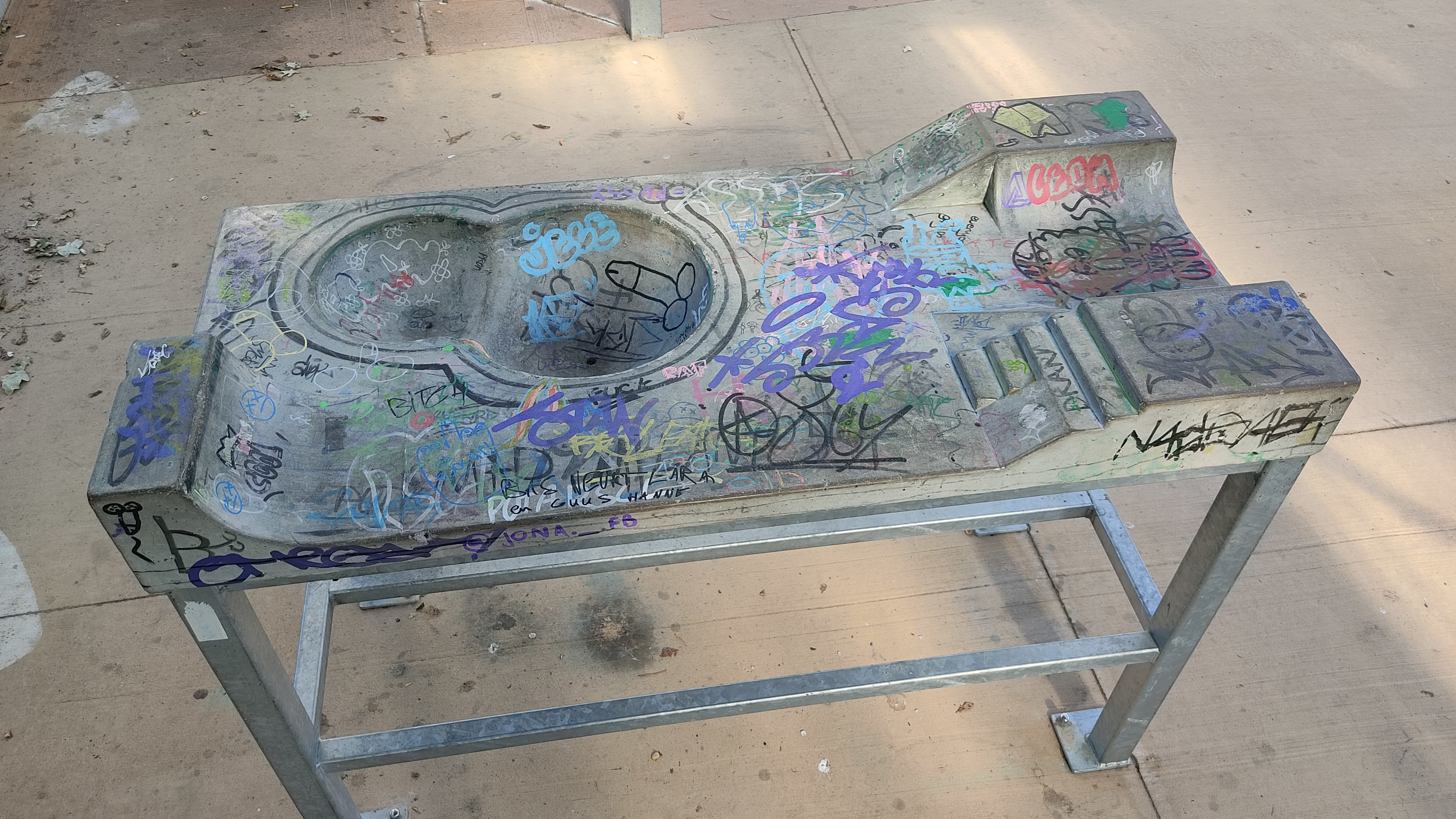
Fingerboard skatepark in Ghent (Belgium)

In 1999, fingerboarding was popular in Europe, Asia, and the United States. Although fingerboarding originated in the United States, it gained popularity in Eastern Europe. Fingerboarding evolved from a hobby to a lifestyle for some people. Fingerboarders had regular contests, fairs, workshops and other events. Examples include FastFingers and FlatFace Rendezvous. Fingerboard-product sales were estimated at $120 million for 1999.

Since the COVID‑19 pandemic, fingerboarding has seen a significant resurgence, especially on platforms like YouTube, TikTok, and Instagram—with creators sharing trick compilations, custom setup showcases, and mini‑park videos that help drive global interest. Several YouTubers, including David Jones, have helped popularise fingerboarding through tutorial and challenge videos online.

In the 21st century, many companies sprang up; producing professional grade fingerboard parts. Examples include Blackriver (founded by Martin Ehrenberger), Flatface (founded by Mike Schneider), and Dynamic (founded by Scott Biesboer). The modern fingerboard has become much more technologically advanced; having a deck pressed out of wooden plies, metal trucks with lock nuts, and often wheels made of urethane with bearings. Additionally most modern fingerboards use a neoprene layer instead of traditional sandpaper griptape. Graphics have also advanced, with technology such as UV transfer and heat transfer being widely used.

== Usage ==
Fingerboards are used by a range of people, from those using them as toys, to skateboarders and related sports professionals envisioning not only their own skating maneuvers but for others as well. Similar to train enthusiasts building railway models, fingerboard hobbyists often construct and purchase reduced scale models that would be considered natural features to an urban skateboarder such as handrails, benches, and stairs they would be likely to encounter while skating. In addition, users might build and buy items seen in a skatepark including half-pipes, quarter pipes, trick boxes, vert ramps, pyramids, banked ramps, full pipes, and any number of other trick-oriented objects. These objects can be used simply for enjoyment and also to assist the visualization of skateboarding tricks or the "flow" from one trick to the next (colloquially referred to as "lines").

In the modern day, a large scene has developed of high-level or competitive fingerboarders. This also includes teams and sponsorships that are run by companies. Experienced riders often participate in filming and uploading full-length videos with members of their team. The competitive scene has culminated in the formation of a world championship in the form of the Fast Fingers competition in Germany.

== Fingersnowboarding ==
Similar to fingerboarding, fingersnowboarding is snowboarding on a small-scale snowboard controlled with one's fingers. In December 1999 the first-ever World Snowboard Fingerboard Championships was held with a cash prize of Can$1,000.00. Sponsored by companies such as Gravity Fingerboards, Transworld Snowboarding and Snowboard Life magazines and others the competition featured twenty competitors utilizing a custom "fingerboard snowboard park." Tom Sims, a world champion of snowboarding, ended his run by landing his fingersnowboard into a flaming shotglass of Sambuca; he was treated for minor burns and donated his winning prize to Surfrider Foundation's Snowrider Project and to Board AID.

== References in media ==
- Tech Deck: Snowboarding is a PC game released in 2000, based upon the Tech Deck brand of fingerboard skateboard toys.
- Tech Deck Skateboarding is a Game Boy Color game released in 2001, based upon the Tech Deck brand of fingerboard skateboard toys.

== See also ==
- Skateboarding brands
