= Vig =

Vig or VIG may refer to:

== Finance ==
- Vigorish or vig, a fee charged by a bookmaker for services
- Vienna Insurance Group, also known as Wiener Städtische Versicherung AG, an Austrian insurance firm
- Vanguard Dividend Appreciation (NYSE Arca VIG), in the List of American exchange-traded funds

== People ==
- Ben Vig, American politician
- Butch Vig (born 1955), music producer and drummer for rock band Garbage
- John Vig (born 1942), American physicist
- Miklós Vig (1898–1944), Hungarian cabaret and jazz singer, actor, comedian and theater secretary

== Places ==
- Vig, Denmark, a railway town on the island of Zeeland, Denmark
- Juan Pablo Pérez Alfonzo Airport (IATA code: VIG), Venezuela

== Science and technology ==
- Vigilance control or dead man's switch
- Vector inversion generator, an electric pulse compression and voltage multiplication device

== Other uses ==
- Vig (surname), an Indian surname
- Video interaction guidance, an interactive method to increase mother-child attachment and other therapeutic gains
