= American Arithmometer Company =

Adding machine manufacturer

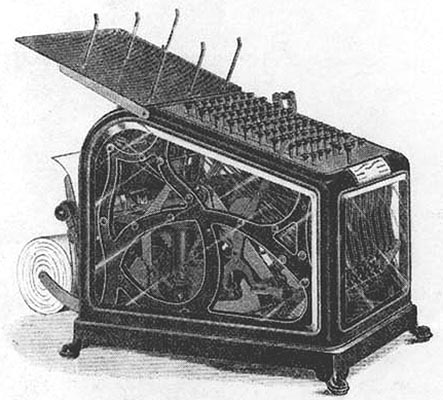
- Class 1 Adding Machine, 1891
- Founded: 1886; 140 years ago in St. Louis, Missouri, United States
- Founder: William Seward Burroughs I
- Defunct: 1905
- Successor: Burroughs Adding Machine Company
- Headquarters: St. Louis, Missouri, United States

The American Arithmometer Company was an American manufacturer organized in St. Louis, Missouri in 1886 by William S. Burroughs that produced adding machines.

== History ==
Burroughs was born in Rochester, New York in 1855. After graduating high school in 1871 and working in a bank, for health reasons he moved south. Burroughs began working in the Boyer Machine Shop in St. Louis, Missouri, constructing models for castings and working on new inventions. At that time he decided to design a machine for solving arithmetical problems. After submitting a patent in 1885 for an adding and listing machine with a full keyboard, on January 20, 1886, Burroughs co-founded the American Arithmometer Company along with Thomas Metcalfe, Richard. M. Scruggs, and William R. Pye. The fledgling company continued to operate out of the Boyer Machine building in St. Louis. Burroughs received a patent for his invention in 1888. Early models (1889) were unreliable yet he persisted and after much trial and error he created corrected models in 1891.

In 1894, an article—clearly referring to the Burroughs Registering Accountant—reported that "An ingenious adding machine, recently introduced in Providence banks, is said to be infallible in results, and to do the work of two or three active clerks. Enclosed in a frame with heavy plate-glass panels, through which the working of the mechanism can be seen, the machine occupies a space of 11 by 15 inches and is nine inches high. On an inclined keyboard are 81 keys, arrange in nine rows of nine keys each. The printing is done through an inked ribbon. In 1895, sales climbed to 284 machines. That same year, Burroughs Adding and Registering Company, Limited of Nottingham, England was established. Three years later, the company's first manufacturing facility outside the U.S. was also established at Nottingham. The year 1895 also marked the company's first dividend payment. The Company continued to maintain an uninterrupted dividend payment record for over 100 years. An 1899 discussion of modern banking methods stated that "great assistance has been derived from certain mechanical labor-saving contrivances, among which I will mention the typewriter, the registering accountant or adding machine, and the telephone. The registering accountant is of comparatively more recent introduction, but I think I can safely say it has proved itself one of the most useful instruments even introduced to the banks." (Bankers' Magazine, Feb. 1899)

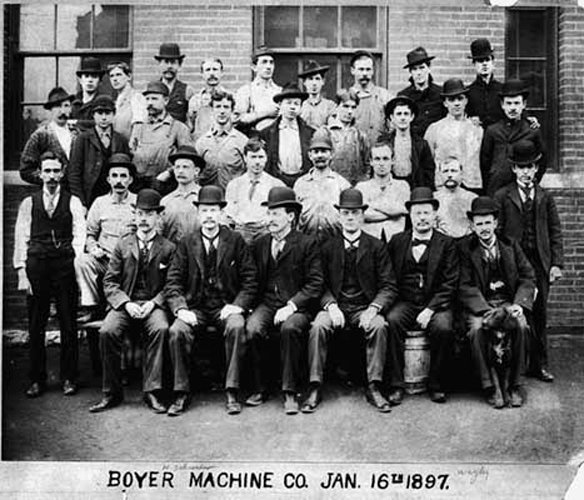
Employees gather outside the Boyer Machine shop in St. Louis, MO 1897

A 1900 ad stated that Burroughs Registering Accountants had been used "in the largest banks in New York City" for five years. A similar ad stated that the Burroughs Registering Accountant was "Used by over 5000 banks, small as well as large." An internal power struggle soon developed between Joseph Boyer and current President and General Manager Edmund G. Langhorne, who, upon losing took half of the employees with him to Universal Adding Machine, also based in St. Louis. Joseph Boyer, the owner of the machine shop, then became president of the American Arithmometer Company in 1902. In March 1905, Burroughs claimed that "there are over 22,000 of these machines now in constant use among banks, mercantile houses, department stores, factories, gas and electric light companies, railroads, express companies, lumber dealers, etc."

In 1905 the Burroughs Adding Machine Company was organized and relocated in Detroit, Michigan as successor to the American Arithmometer Company, where it built a 70,304 square foot plant in a cornfield owned by the Ferry Seed Company. All employees and their families were moved from St. Louis to Detroit in one day on a special train called the "Clover Leaf Express". That site, which was then at the city's northern limits, is now bordered by Second and Third Avenues on the east and west and by Burroughs and Amsterdam Avenues on the north and south. Burroughs claimed that as of October 5, 1906, 40,000 of its machines were in use in over 30,000 concerns and that "ninety per cent of all adding machines sold are Burroughs."

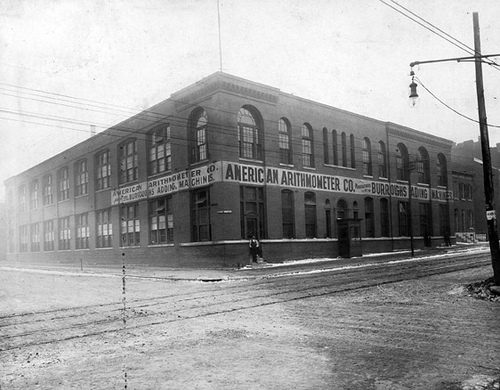
Main Factory at 2100 Wash, St Louis prior to 1905

Burroughs also advertised an electric model in 1906. At that time, Burroughs machines ranged in price from $300 to $500 depending on model. Burroughs manufactured its 50,000th machine in 1907 and claimed that the 13,300 machines that it sold during 1907 exceeded "the combined sales of all other makes of adding machines during all the years of their existence." In 1908 Burroughs offered 58 models, "One built for every line of business." The many models varied in number of columns, the width of the paper onto which they printed, whether they were designed for computations involving fractions, feet and inches, pounds and ounces, etc., and whether they had features such as counters and split keyboards. In 1908 Burroughs also stated that "Nine out of ten adding machines in use are Burroughs." That same year Burroughs also acquired the Universal Adding Machine Co. which described its products as "A Typewriter Carriage on an Adding Machine." In 1909, Burroughs acquired the Pike Adding Machine Co. and in the same year began to sell Burroughs Pike visible adding machines.

During the first decade of the 20th century, Burroughs faced competition from both key-driven calculators and a number of rival adding-listing machines, including Dalton, Pike, Standard, Universal, and Wales. Unlike Burroughs, these competing machines had "visible" printers that printed in view of the operator. Pike, Universal, and Wales machines had full keyboards like the machines produced by Burroughs. By contrast, Dalton Adding Machine and the Standard Adding Machine Company had more modern ten-key keyboards.

By 1910 Burroughs offered 74 models with between 6 and 17 columns of keys and began advertising some of its models as bookkeeping machines. In 1911 there were 78 Burroughs models ranging in price from $175 to $850 and Burroughs introduced its Burroughs Class 3 visible adding machines based on the Pike design. Also in 1911, Burroughs introduced a key-driven calculator that looked very much like a Felt & Tarrant Comptometer. In 1912, the Burroughs Calculator was $150. Felt & Tarrant sued Burroughs for patent infringement based on the similarity of the cases, and Burroughs modified the appearance of its calculator. In 1914, following an antitrust suit, Burroughs was banned from buying competing companies. By 1916 there were 98 models, including a machine with 17 columns of keys priced at $615–$715. In 1928, Burroughs claimed that 100,000 Burroughs Portables had been sold. In 1935, Burroughs offered 450 standard models.

Although the machine was a commercial success, Burroughs died in 1898 before receiving much money from it. However, one year before his death he received the John Scott Medal of the Franklin Institute as an award for his invention.
