= Ian A. Young =

American electrical engineer

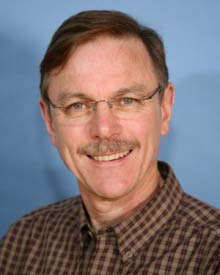
- Born: Melbourne, Australia
- Education: University of California, Berkeley, University of Melbourne, Australia
- Known for: Phase-locked loop
- Awards: Fellow, IEEE 1999; Fellow Intel 1996, Senior Fellow Intel 2004
- Scientific career
- Workplaces: Intel, University of California, Berkeley, Mostek
- Thesis: MOS switched-capacitor analogue sampled-data recursive filters (1978)
- Doctoral advisor: David A. Hodges, Paul R. Gray, Donald Pederson (postdoc)

Ian A. Young is an Intel engineer. Young is a co-author of 50 research papers, and has 71 patents in switched capacitor circuits, DRAM, SRAM, BiCMOS, x86 clocking, Photonics and spintronics.

== Biography ==
Born in Melbourne, Australia, Young received his bachelor's and master's degrees in electrical engineering from the University of Melbourne, Australia. He received his PhD in electrical engineering from the University of California, Berkeley in 1978, where he did research on MOSFET switched-capacitor filters.

== Technical career ==
Young obtained his PhD from University of California, Berkeley in 1978, working with David A. Hodges, developing the switched MOS capacitor circuits.

=== Intel BiCMOS for Logic and SRAM ===
Young started at Intel in 1983 with the development of circuits for 1 Mb DRAM in 1 μm CMOS in 1985, and first 64 K SRAM in 1 μm CMOS. This was also the first military qualified SRAM under the VHIC program. At 600 nanometre node, Intel adopted BiCMOS for logic requiring the development of a BiCMOS SRAM for cache and a new family of standard logic circuits. The BiCMOS circuits were developed for the Pentium processor family and its follow-on generations, Pentium Pro, Pentium II processor family.

=== Pentium era and clock scaling ===
Young developed a Phase Locked Loop (PLL) based clocking circuit in a microprocessor while working on the 50 MHz Intel 80486 processor design. He subsequently developed the core PLL clocking circuit building blocks used in each generation of Intel microprocessors through the 0.13 μm 3.2 GHz Pentium 4. The successful introduction of GHz clocking contributed to improvements in computing power.

The 486DX2 architecture showing on board PLL and clock

The integration of an on-chip PLL enabled the clock rates to exceed the off chip interconnect I/O rate in DX2. This led to the integration of an on-chip cache, paving the path for the first microprocessor with 1 million transistors.

=== Beyond CMOS computing ===
He is the founding editor-in-chief of IEEE Journal of Exploratory Solid State Computational Devices.

== Awards and honours ==
- 1996: Fellow of Intel (highest technical position at Intel until 2002)
- 1999: Fellow of IEEE
- 1991–1996: program committee for the Symposium on VLSI Circuits
- 2004: Senior Fellow of Intel (highest technical position at Intel since 2002)
- 2009: International Solid-State Circuits Conference's Jack Raper Award for Outstanding Technology Directions paper
- 2012: Plenary Speaker at IEEE Device Research Conference
- 2014: Editor-in-Chief of IEEE Journal on Exploratory Solid-State Computational Devices and Circuits

== Selected works ==
- Young, I.A.; Greason, J.K.; Wong, K.L.. "A PLL clock generator with 5 to 110 MHz of lock range for microprocessors," Solid-State Circuits, IEEE Journal of, vol.27, no.11, pp. 1599–1607, Nov. 1992.
- Young, Ian A., Monte F. Mar, and Bharat Bhushan. "A 0.35 μm CMOS 3–880 MHz PLL N/2 clock multiplier and distribution network with low jitter for microprocessors." Solid-State Circuits Conference, 1997. Digest of Technical Papers. 43rd ISSCC, 1997 IEEE International. IEEE, 1997.
- Young, I.A.; Hodges, D.A. "MOS switched-capacitor analog sampled-data direct-form recursive filters," IEEE Journal of Solid-State Circuits, vol.14, no.6, pp. 1020–1033, Dec. 1979
- Young, Ian. A History of the Continuously Innovative Analog Integrated Circuit.
- Young, Ian A., et al. "Optical I/O technology for tera-scale computing." Solid-State Circuits, IEEE Journal of 45.1 (2010): 235–248.
- Muthali, H.S.; Thomas, T.P.; Young, I.A. "A CMOS 10-gb/s SONET transceiver," Solid-State Circuits, IEEE Journal of, vol.39, no.7, pp. 1026– 1033, July 2004.
- Manipatruni, S.; Lipson, M.; Young, I. "Device Scaling Considerations for Nanophotonic CMOS Global Interconnects," IEEE Journal of Selected Topics in Quantum Electronics, vol.PP, no.99, pp. 1.
- D.E. Nikonov, I. A. Young, Overview of Beyond-CMOS Devices and A Uniform Methodology for Their Benchmarking IEDM 2012
- Avci, U.E.; Rios, R.; Kuhn, K.; Young, I.A. "Comparison of performance, switching energy and process variations for the TFET and MOSFET in logic," VLSI Technology (VLSIT), 2011 Symposium on, vol., no., pp. 124,125, 14–16 June 2011.
- Manipatruni, S.; Nikonov. D.E.; Young, Ian."Material Targets for Scaling All-Spin Logic", Phys. Rev. Applied 5, 014002.

== Selected patents ==
- 5,412,349, PLL clock generator integrated with microprocessor, 5 February 1995
- 5,446,867, Microprocessor PLL clock circuit with selectable delayed feedback, 29 August 1995
- 5,280,605, Clock speed limiter for microprocessor, 18 January 1994
- 6,081,141, Hierarchical Clock Frequency Domains for a Semiconductor Device, 27 June 2000
- 6,512,861, Packaging and assembly method for optical coupling, 28 January 2003
- 6,636,976, Mechanism to Control di/dt for a Microprocessor, 21 October 2003
- 6,075,908 Paniccia, Mario J., Valluri RM Rao, and Ian A. Young. "Method and apparatus for optically modulating light through the back side of an integrated circuit die." 13 June 2000.
- 7,049,704 Chakravorty, K. K., Swan, J., Barnett, B. C., Ahadian, J. F., Thomas, T. P., & Young, I. (2006). US Patent No.
- 6,125,217 Paniccia, M. J., Young, I. A., Thomas, T. P., & Rao, V. R. (2000)
