= Joseph Boyer =

American computer industrialist (1848–1930)

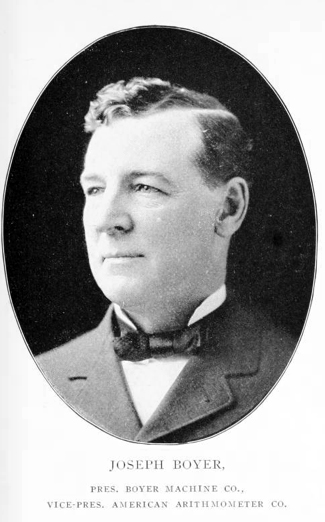
- Born: Joseph E. Boyer c. 1848
- Died: October 24, 1930 (aged 82); Detroit, Michigan, United States

Joseph E. Boyer (c. 1848 – October 24, 1930) was an American inventor and computer industrialist.

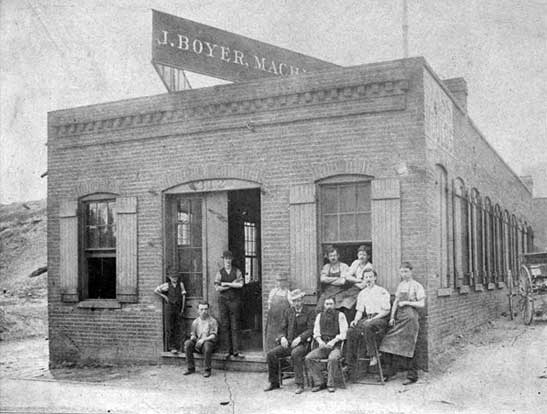
Boyer Machine circa 1880 St Louis, Missouri

Boyer was President of the J. Boyer Machine Co. in St. Louis, Missouri. He helped William Seward Burroughs I develop the adding machine and was the inventor of the first successful rivet gun. As the third president of the American Arithmometer Company, in the first of a series of business moves designed to eliminate the competition, in 1903 he secretly agreed to acquire the Addograph Manufacturing Company. Then in 1905 Boyer relocated the entire company from St. Louis to Detroit, Michigan at which point the company name was changed to the Burroughs Adding Machine Company. He served as president until 1920.

Joseph Boyer, then President of the American Arithmometer Company, was quoted as saying:

There was Burroughs with his great idea, greater than any of us could fully appreciate, and with his meager capital of $300. Long before the first model was actually begun his money was gone. But as his resources dwindled, his courage grew. I used to leave him at his bench in the evening and find him still there in the morning.

When the first machine proved a failure, Burroughs made another model. Finally, the third model seemed to meet his standards. He could make it perform mathematical wonders, so a lot of 50 machines was made. However, when untrained operators ran the machines, they got the most amazing results. People began to question Burroughs' judgment and doubt his ability.

Everyone but Burroughs was ready to quit. Yet the inventor himself was undaunted, demonstrating his contempt for imperfection by tossing the 50 machines, one by one, out of a second-story window. Then he began work on a new model. Night after night he worked feverishly, 24 hours a day, 34 hours at a stretch. Then, at last, the wonderful governor that has made the machine foolproof was invented. Burroughs was jubilant. His machine was perfect. His faith had been justified.

Boyer died of pneumonia in Detroit.
