= IEEE Richard M. Emberson Award =

IEEE Award

- Awarded for: Distinguished service to the development, viability, advancement, and pursuit of the technical objectives of the IEEE
- Rewards: Bronze medal, illuminated certificate, honorarium, and travel expenses to award ceremony
- First award: 1986
- Website: IEEE Richard M. Emberson Award

The IEEE Richard M. Emberson Award was established by the IEEE Board of Directors in 1986. It is presented to an IEEE member for distinguished service to the development, viability, advancement, and pursuit of the technical objectives of the IEEE.

Recipients of this award receives a bronze medal, illuminated certificate, honorarium, and travel expenses to award ceremony.

== Richard M. Emberson ==
Richard M. Emberson was the executive director of the IEEE. Before that, he was the assistant to the President of Associated Universities, Inc, and then, in 1957, the project manager for the development of Green Bank, West Virginia of NRAO.

== Recipients ==
- 2025: Bruno K. Meyer
- 2024: Stefan Mozar
- 2023: Ross W. Stone
- 2020: John Vig
- 2019: Marcel Keschner
- 2018: Donald Heirman
- 2017: David A. Hodges
- 2016: Stephen B. Weinstein
- 2015: Raymond S. Larsen
- 2014: Wanda K. Reder
- 2013: Leah Jamieson
- 2012: Bruce Eisenstein
- 2011: Donald C. Loughry
- 2010: James M. Tien
- 2009: Harold L. Flescher
- 2008: James T. (Tom) Cain
- 2006: Don Bolle
- 2005: Lloyd A. (Pete) Morley
- 2004: Kenneth R. Laker
- 2003: Wilfred Kenneth Dawson
- 2002: Robert W. Lucky
- 2001: Charles J. Robinson
- 2000: J. David Irwin
- 1999: Edward A. Parrish
- 1998: H. Troy Nagle
- 1997: Friedolf M. Smits
- 1996: Theodore S. Saad
- 1995: Theodore W. Hissey, Jr.
- 1994: Oscar N. Garcia
- 1993: William R. Tackaberry
- 1992: Bruno O. Weinschel
- 1991: Stephen J. Kahne
- 1990: Harold Chestnut
- 1989: Jose B. Cruz, Jr.
- 1988: Merlin G. Smith
