= Heirman =

Heirman is a surname. Notable people with the surname include:

- Donald Heirman (1940–2020), American electrical engineer and military officer
- Shane Heirman (born 1988), American basketball coach
