= James Tien =

James Tien is the name of:

- James Tien (actor) (田俊; born 1942), Hong Kong actor from Guangdong
- James Tien (politician) (田北俊; born 1947), Hong Kong politician, former Liberal Party chairman and Legislative Council member
- James M. Tien, American engineering professor, University of Miami College of Engineering
