= Alistair Duffy =

Alistair Duffy is an electrical engineer at De Montfort University in Leicester, England. He was named a Fellow of the Institute of Electrical and Electronics Engineers (IEEE) in 2015 for his development of validation methods in computational electromagnetics.

== IEEE work ==
Duffy was interested in standards education and became chair of the Standards Development and Education Committee at the IEEE Electromagnetic Compatibility Society, encouraged and mentored by Donald Heirman.

He was president of the EMC Society for 2020–2021.
