= Bruce Eisenstein =

American engineering educator

- Education: B.S., MIT, 1963; M.S., Drexel, 1965; Ph.D., Penn, 1970
- Scientific career
- Fields: Pattern recognition, estimation theory, decision theory, digital signal processing
- Workplaces: Drexel University

Bruce Eisenstein is an engineering educator serving as the Arthur J. Rowland Professor of Electrical and Computer Engineering. He was formerly Interim Dean and Vice Dean of the College of Engineering at Drexel University. He has published nearly 50 papers in the areas of digital signal processing, pattern recognition, deconvolution, along with biomedical engineering. He also served as president of the IEEE in 2000.

== Biography ==
Eisenstein received a Bachelor of Science degree in Electrical and Electronics Engineering in 1963 from Massachusetts Institute of Technology. He attended Drexel University as a master's degree student, obtaining his MSEE in 1965. He then attended the University of Pennsylvania where he graduated with a Ph.D. in 1970. Eisenstein then worked as a NASA/ASEE Fellow at Stanford University and the Ames Research Center, then as a visiting research fellow in Electrical Engineering at Princeton University under the sponsorship of the National Science Foundation. He then returned to Drexel University in 1980 and was appointed professor and department head of electrical and computer engineering. He served in that capacity until 1995 at which time he was appointed the Arthur J. Rowland Professor of Electrical and Computer Engineering, a position that he still holds. During his time at Drexel, he has served as associate dean of the graduate school, member of the Provost’s Blue Ribbon Committee on Priorities, the Faculty Senate Committee on Budget, Priorities and Development, the Provost’s Strategic Task Force on Enriching Undergraduate Education and is currently serving as the co-chair of the Middle States Accreditation steering committee. In 2011, following the resignation of the dean of the College of Engineering, Eisenstein took over as interim dean.

== Activities with IEEE ==
Eisenstein served as 38th president of the Institute of Electrical and Electronics Engineers His other IEEE positions have included chairman of the Philadelphia Section, IEEE treasurer, vice president for technical activities, member of the board of directors, director of Division VI: Engineering and the Human Environment and president of the Education Society.

== Other professional activities ==
Bruce Eisenstein also works as an independent consultant and expert witness in the area of cellular telecommunications tower and antenna siting. He has been utilized as an expert by municipalities and citizen objector groups to review and comment on radio frequency testimony given by wireless service providers.

He also works as a consultant and expert witness for intellectual property and product liability cases. He is also a Professional Engineer registered in Pennsylvania.

== Awards and honors ==
He was the 1976 recipient of the C. Holmes MacDonald Award of Eta Kappa Nu given to the Outstanding Young Electrical Engineering Educator. He is a former president of Eta Kappa Nu (Electrical Engineering honor society), and currently serves as a vice president. He has also served as the president of the national ECE Department Heads’ Association (ECEDHA). Eisenstein is also a member of Tau Beta Pi (Engineering honor society), Sigma Xi (Honor society for researchers), and ASEE. He chaired the National Science Foundation Advisory Committee for the Electrical, Communications, & Systems Engineering Directorate, and currently serves on the ABET board of directors. Eisenstein was elected Delaware Valley Engineer of the Year in 2000. In 2012 he received the IEEE Richard M. Emberson Award

== Books published ==
- Practical Engineering Design (with Maja Bystrom)
