= Donald Heirman =

American engineer

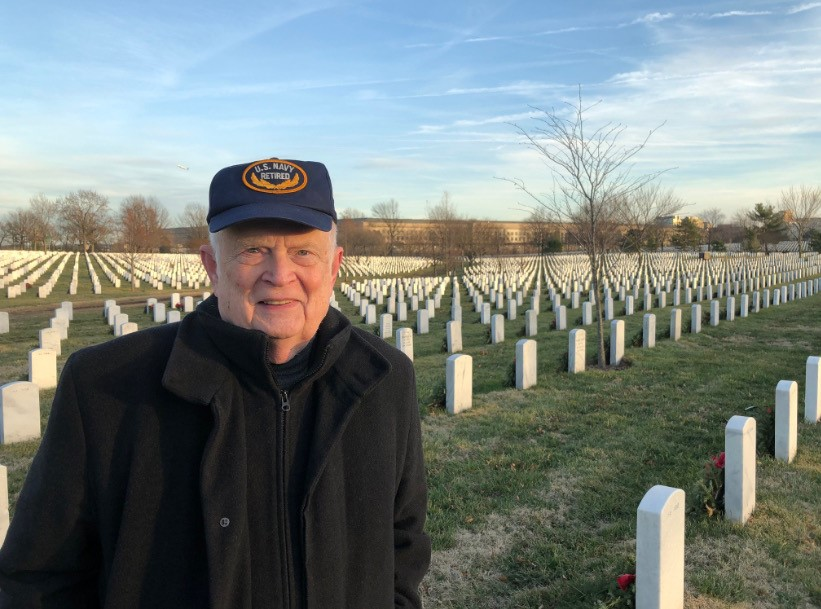
- Donald Heirman visiting Arlington Cemetery in January 2020
- Born: August 16, 1940; Mishawaka, Indiana, U.S.
- Died: October 30, 2020 (aged 80); Lincroft, New Jersey, U.S.
- Education: Purdue University
- Awards: IEEE Richard M. Emberson Award (2018); Elihu Thomson Electrotechnology Medal, American National Standards Institute (2017); IEC Lord Kelvin Award (2008); IEEE Charles Proteus Steinmetz Award (1997)
- Scientific career
- Fields: Electromagnetic compatibility
- Workplaces: Bell Laboratories, IEEE, University of Oklahoma

Donald Nestor Heirman (August 16, 1940 – October 30, 2020) was an American electrical engineer and military officer.

He was a major contributor to international EMC standardization, serving as president of the IEEE Standards Association, and chair of the International Special Committee on Radio Interference (CISPR). He received the IEC Lord Kelvin Award in 2008, among other awards. He worked for Bell Labs for over 30 years, focusing on electromagnetic compatibility (EMC) compliance testing and interference suppression research.

== Biography ==
Heirman was born and raised in Mishawaka, Indiana, where his father worked as a foreman for Uniroyal (US Rubber). His potential as a student was evident from his time in Mishawaka High School, where he was involved in several extracurricular activities such as science and engineering clubs, choir, photographer for a newsletter, editor-in-chief of the yearbook, drama production, among others. He also excelled academically, being inducted into the National Honor Society as a junior. Graduating in 1958, he was co-salutatorian of his senior class, and received a Lions Club Award and a college scholarship from the Kiwanis Club.

He obtained a bachelor's degree in electrical engineering from Purdue University in 1962, and a master's degree in 1963, with Floyd Van Nest Schultz, a radar and radio pioneer, being one the professors that most influenced him. While enrolled on his master's degree he met Lois Marlene, a local West Lafayette girl working as secretary of the men's residence hall. They were married on June 8, 1963, at the St. Thomas Aquinas Catholic Church in the Purdue campus.

Heirman was an ensign in the US Navy Reserve, promoted to executive officer in the 1961 annual Navy review. During active duty at the Office of the Chief of Naval Operations in the Pentagon from 1963 to 1965, he worked on predicting ship-to-ship high-frequency radio propagation. He retired in 1985 with the rank of Commander.

Away from his work, Heirman was involved with his church's choir, collected Lionel Trains, and led a project to create a historical museum in Mishawaka, donating the building to house it and serving as board president.

He died from congestive heart failure, possibly alongside COVID-19 complications, on October 30, 2020, aged 80 years old, and was buried at Arlington National Cemetery alongside his wife.

== Professional career ==
Heirman worked for Bell Labs in different capacities for over 30 years, mainly at the Bell Labs Holmdel Complex. He focused on electromagnetic compatibility (EMC) compliance testing and interference suppression research, for example in RF absorbers and anechoic chamber measurements. He received the Bell Labs Distinguished Technical Staff Award in 1982. He was the founding manager of the Lucent Technologies (Bell Labs) Global Product Compliance Laboratory.

In 1997, after retiring from Bell Labs, he started his own EMC consulting company, Don Heirman Consultants, located in Lincroft, New Jersey. He was also associate director of the Wireless EMC Center at the University of Oklahoma, in Norman.

Heirman was very involved with the activities of the Institute of Electrical and Electronics Engineers (IEEE), joining in the early seventies, serving in different capacities and eventually reaching leadership positions such as president of the EMC Society (1980–1981), and president of the IEEE Standards Association (2005–2006). He was named IEEE Fellow in 1987 for "leadership in establishing techniques and standards for accurate electromagnetic emission measurements", and IEEE Life Fellow in 2007.

He mentored and encouraged other engineers to participate in EMC Society standards work, such as Alistair Duffy, IEEE EMC Society president (2020–2021). Due to his contributions to the field over the years he was called "Mr. EMC Standards".

=== Technical committee service ===
Heirman served in various roles in technical committees within the IEEE, International Electrotechnical Commission (IEC), and the American National Standards Institute (ANSI):

- IEC Advisory Committee on EMC (ACEC), director, 2013–2020.
- International Special Committee on Radio Interference (CISPR), chair, 2007.
- C63.4 (emission measurements) Working Group, IEEE, chair.
- Technical Management Committee of the US National Committee of the IEC, life member.
- Testing and Certification Committee of the US Smart Electric Power Alliance (SEPA), vice chairman.

=== Awards ===
- IEEE Richard M. Emberson Award (2018): "For distinguished service advancing the technical objectives of the IEEE"
- Elihu Thomson Electrotechnology Medal, ANSI (2017)
- Outstanding Electrical and Computer Engineer Award, Purdue University (2011)
- IEC Lord Kelvin Award (2008)
- IEEE Charles Proteus Steinmetz Award (1997)
- Richard R. Stoddard Award, IEEE EMC Society (1995)

== Selected publications ==
- Heirman, D.N. (2012). "What makes Smart Grid — Smart — And who is in the "game"?". IEEE Electromagnetic Compatibility Magazine. 1 (2): 95–99. doi:10.1109/MEMC.2012.6244981. S2CID 23011014.
- Grant, H.; Heirman, D. N.; Kuriger, G.; Ravindran, M. M. (2004). "In vitro study of the electromagnetic interaction between wireless phones and an implantable neural stimulator". Bioelectromagnetics. 25 (5): 356–361. doi:10.1002/bem.10204. PMID 15197759. S2CID 38781950.
- Kuriger, G.; Grant, H.; Cartwright, A.; Heirman, D. (2003). "Investigation of spurious emissions from cellular phones and the possible effect on aircraft navigation equipment". IEEE Transactions on Electromagnetic Compatibility. 45 (2): 281–292. doi:10.1109/TEMC.2003.811309.
- Heirman, D.N. (2002). "CISPR Subcommittee A uncertainty activity [RFI measurement]". IEEE Transactions on Electromagnetic Compatibility. 44 (1): 125–129. doi:10.1109/15.990718.
- Heirman, D.N. (1975). "Time Variations and Harmonic Content of Inductive Interference in Urban/Suburban and Residential/Rural Telephone Plants". IEEE Transactions on Communications. 23 (12): 1484–1495. doi:10.1109/TCOM.1975.1092761.
