= St. Thomas Aquinas Purdue =

St. Thomas Aquinas, The Catholic Center at Purdue
- Location within Indiana
- 40°25′25.2120″N 86°54′48.1140″W
- Location: 535 W State St; West Lafayette, Indiana
- Country: United States
- Denomination: Roman Catholic
- Website: www.boilercatholics.org

History
- Status: Church Newman Center
- Dedication: St. Thomas Aquinas
- Consecrated: April 9, 1951

Architecture
- Functional status: Active
- Architect: Elliot Brenner
- Architectural type: Type
- Style: French Brutalism

Specifications
- Capacity: 1200

Administration
- Diocese: Lafayette-in-Indiana
- Deanery: Lafayette Deanery
- Parish: St. Thomas Aquinas

Clergy
- Pastor(s): Fr. Andrew McAlpin, O.P.

St. Thomas Aquinas Catholic Church is the Catholic university parish at Purdue University. It is in the Roman Catholic Diocese of Lafayette in Indiana. It is often referred to as "St. Tom's" by parishioners.

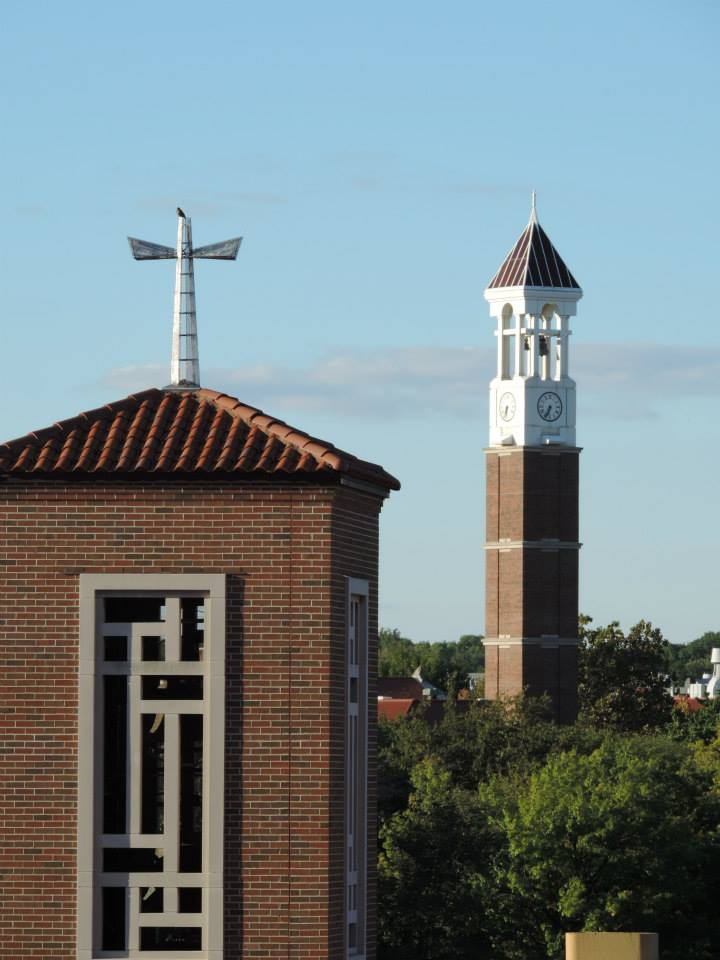
St. Thomas Aquinas Bell Tower

== History ==
Purdue Catholic Campus Ministry began in 1906 when the Catholic Club was founded. Students traveled across the Wabash River to attend services at St. Mary's Cathedral in Lafayette. The Newman Club was chartered in 1927. In 1928, Reverend Leo Pursley was assigned as associate pastor of St. Mary's Church and to work with Purdue students.

In the late 1940s, Fr. Thomas Heilman had a vision to establish a student center at Purdue University to serve the spiritual needs of Catholics attending Purdue University. Bishop John Bennett dedicated St. Thomas Aquinas Center as a Catholic student chapel at Purdue University on April 9, 1951. Fr. Heilman's vision called for adequate space and facilities for programs, faith sharing, and for social as well as educational activities. What started as a small dinner in Bishop Bennett's home turned into the beginning pledges towards a Catholic Chapel at Purdue. St. Mary's parishioners fundraised $275,000 to build St. Thomas Aquinas. The St. Thomas Aquinas Chapel was dedicated in 1951. Bishop Bennett made Father Thomas Heilman the students' vicar. The Sunday Visitor Foundation's grant and a Cathedral Appeal enabled Bishop Bennett to purchase the State Street property. With the 1957 advent of Father Leo Piguet and his associate, Father Leo Haigerty, a Notre Dame University credit course was developed. St. Thomas Aquinas became the preferred name in 1962. Communion breakfasts, group meetings, lectures and social gatherings met in Newman Hall. In 1963, adjacent property was purchased. Bishop John Carberry dedicated the expanded St. Thomas Aquinas Church on May 3, 1964. The design that provided a seating capacity of 1,100 received the first-place award for church renovation from the North American Liturgical Conference in 1964. Area residents' participation, especially the Cathedral Christian Family Movement's parties in the 1960s, enriched the already diverse parish. Two or three priests met the needs of its several thousand members.

== Priests ==
=== Fr. Andrew McAlpin, O.P. (2024–present) ===
Father Andrew McAlpin, OP became pastor of St. Thomas Aquinas Catholic Center at Purdue University, effective July 1, 2024. Growing up in Minnesota and after graduating from the University of St. Thomas in St. Paul, Minnesota, he entered the Dominicans in 2003. His novitiate year was in Denver, and his studentate years were spent in St. Louis, Missouri, where he was ordained in 2009.

=== Fr. Thomas McDermott, O.P. (2020–2024) ===
Father Thomas McDermott, OP became pastor of St. Thomas Aquinas Catholic Center at Purdue University, effective July 1, 2020. Growing up in northeastern Nebraska and after graduating from St. John's University in Collegeville, Minnesota, he entered the Dominicans in 1977. His novitiate year was in Denver, and his studentate years were spent in Dubuque, Iowa, and St. Louis, where he was ordained in 1983.

Father Tom's first encounter with Purdue University was attendance at a campus conference as a high school student.

=== Fr. Patrick Baikauskas, O.P. (2008–2020) ===
Father Patrick Baikauskas, OP was assigned to St. Thomas Aquinas in January 2008 and became pastor and director of campus ministry in 2010. He was born the youngest of four boys in Crete, Illinois, a small town near the Indiana border. He has a BA in political science from Bradley University, and a history working in government under three Illinois governors. When he chose to join the priesthood in 2001, he was accepted to the Order of Preachers, the Dominicans, and studied at the Aquinas Institute of Theology until 2007. Since beginning his Dominican life at St. Tom's, he has seen the beginning of several new ministries. Father Patrick has traveled with teams across the country helping relief efforts in the South and Appalachia through Habitat for Humanity and other community based organizations, as well as to Haiti and Cuba. He is active in fundraising for the Greater Lafayette Hunger Hike, and Purdue's Polar Plunge, for which he was the top fundraiser for 2013.

Fr. Patrick was selected to be one of Pope Francis's Missionaries of Mercy in 2016. Fr. Patrick stated: "God’s love and mercy are greater than we possibly can imagine. When I first heard about it, I thought it would be a wonderful thing in recognition of what we have done to promote the sacrament of reconciliation. I truly had no idea that I would be one of a mere 125 from the United States."

=== Fr. Daniel Davis, O.P. (2000–2008) ===
Fr. Davis was the first Dominican Friar to become pastor of St. Tom's after the ministry was entrusted to the Province of St. Albert the Great, often referred to as the "Central Province" of Dominicans. by Bishop Higi.

== Community outreach ==
=== Lafayette Urban Ministry ===
Together with Lafayette Urban Ministry (LUM), in 1984, St. Thomas Aquinas established Lafayette's first emergency shelter for the homeless. LUM benefits from Hunger Hike, of which St. Tom's is a big supporter.

=== Hunger Hike ===
St. Tom's also participates in the Hunger Hike each year, which raises awareness for and benefits the Fight Against Hunger. It was the top church fundraiser for 2015. 2015's Hunger Hike surpassed the $100,000 goal, which helps groups around Lafayette to fight hunger right here in the Greater Lafayette area.

=== How-To Festival ===
The How-To Festival of Greater Lafayette was hosted at St. Tom's each year and gathered a committee of students and residents to plan and reach out to the community for presenters. The purpose was for people of all backgrounds to learn a new skill, while appreciating those who are able to teach it to them.

== Notable people ==
- Durward Kirby, song and dance man, hosted "Candid Camera," gave the altar in memory of his father.
