= Mary Antona Ebo =

American civil rights activist and nun (1924–2017)

Mary Antona Ebo FSM
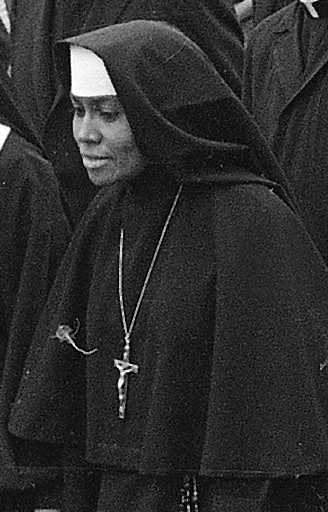
- Ebo at Selma in 1965
- Born: Elizabeth Louise Ebo; April 10, 1924; Bloomington, Illinois, U.S.
- Died: November 11, 2017 (aged 93); St. Louis, Missouri, U.S.
- Other name: Sister Antona
- Education: Saint Louis University; Aquinas Institute of Theology
- Occupations: Religious sister, civil rights activist
- Known for: Marched with Martin Luther King Jr. at Selma in 1965

Mary Antona Ebo, FSM, (born Elizabeth Louise "Betty Lou" Ebo; April 10, 1924 – November 11, 2017) was an American nun, hospital administrator, and civil rights activist. She was the first African-American woman to head a Catholic hospital, and is known for marching with Martin Luther King Jr. in Selma in 1965, famously saying "I'm here because I'm a Negro, a nun, a Catholic, and because I want to bear witness." She was a member of the Franciscan Sisters of Mary.

== Early life and education ==
Ebo was born in Bloomington, Illinois, the daughter of Daniel Ebo and Louise Teal Ebo. She lived at the McLean County Home for Colored Children with her two older siblings from 1930 to 1942, after her mother's death and her father's unemployment during the Great Depression. She was hospitalized for long periods of her childhood, once for an infected thumb requiring amputation, and later with tuberculosis.

She converted to Catholicism in 1942. She recounted in a later interview that when news that she was becoming Catholic got to the president of the board of the McLean County Home for Colored Children, she was told that she could no longer live there. A public health nurse from Fairview brought her to Holy Trinity High School and to a local family. In 1944, she became the first black student to graduate from Holy Trinity High School. Denied entry to St. Joseph's Nursing School because of her race, she trained as a nurse through the U.S. Cadet Nurse Corps at the St. Mary's (Colored) Infirmary School of Nursing in St. Louis.

Sister Mary Antona Ebo was part of the extended Ebo family from South Carolina. She was the niece of Israel Ebo Sr. (1909–1985), the son of Burrell Ebo and Eliza Lark. The Ebo family traces its roots to Georgia and South Carolina's post-Reconstruction era, with multiple generations dedicated to faith, service, and education. The Ebo family members were prominent, landowning African Americans in South Carolina and maintained a strong tradition of education, faith, and civic involvement that shaped Sister Ebo's later ministry and activism, and her commitment to social justice and spiritual leadership

Ebo would enter the Franciscan Sisters of Mary in 1946 and made final vows in 1954 as one of the order's first Black members, at a time when strict segregation was still maintained within the order itself. As a religious sister, Ebo pursued further education, earning a bachelor's degree in medical record library science from Saint Louis University in 1962, and two master's degrees, one in hospital executive development (1970) from Saint Louis University, and one in theology of health care (1978) from Aquinas Institute of Theology. From 1979, she held a chaplain's certificate from the National Association of Catholic Chaplains.

== Career ==
=== Medical and pastoral work ===
Ebo was one of the first three black women to join the Sisters of St. Mary in 1946, and became Sister Mary Antona when she took her final vows in 1954. She worked in medical records at Firmin Desloge Hospital from 1955 to 1961, and was director of medical records at St. Mary's Infirmary from 1962 to 1967 and also served a year as director of medical records at St. Mary's Health Center. She integrated the unit's clerical staff. In 1967, she was named executive director of St. Clare's Hospital in Baraboo, Wisconsin, the first African-American woman to be head of a Catholic hospital. In 1974 she was named executive director of the Wisconsin Conference of Catholic Hospitals. She worked at Catholic hospitals in Madison, Wisconsin, and at the University of Mississippi Medical Center. From 1992 to 2008, she was a pastoral associate at St. Nicholas Church in St. Louis.

=== Civil rights activism ===
With encouragement from her mother superior, Ebo and five other nuns joined the Martin Luther King's march in Selma in 1965, wearing their orders' full habits. During the march, she famously told reporters, "I'm here because I'm a Negro, a nun, a Catholic, and because I want to bear witness." Ebo's story was included in the documentary Sisters of Selma: Bearing Witness for Change (2007).

She also became an activist within Roman Catholic religious life. In 1967, her religious superiors were unwilling to provide a short-term release from duties to enable her to accept an assignment with the National Catholic Conference for Interracial Justice (NCCIJ). She wrote to the highest-ranking sister of the NCCIJ criticizing "not only the lack of generosity of those orders who may have a sister to contribute. . . .but also orders who have for so long taken a 'lily-white' attitude toward God-given vocations." in 1968, Ebo was a founder of the National Black Sisters' Conference, and president of the conference from 1980 to 1982. In 1989, she received the conference's Harriet Tubman Award for service and leadership. She served on the Human Rights Commission of the Archdiocese of St. Louis, and was a member of the Missouri Catholic Conference on Social Concerns.

In 1999, she received the Eucharist from Pope John Paul II, in a group of congregants including Rosa Parks, when the pontiff visited St. Louis. In 2013 she attended a commemoration of the 1965 march and cross the Edmund Pettus Bridge with Congressman John Lewis. In 2014, in her nineties, Ebo gave a message at a prayer service in Ferguson following the death of Michael Brown Jr.

== Death ==
Sister Mary Antona Ebo died in 2017, aged 93, at the Sarah Community, a retirement home in Bridgeton, Missouri, after 71 years in religious life.

== Honors ==
A seminar room at the Cardinal Rigali Center in St. Louis is named for Ebo. The Missouri History Museum celebrated her in July 2017 as part of an exhibit entitles, #1 in Civil Rights: The African-American Freedom Struggle in St. Louis.

She received six honorary doctorates, including one from the Aquinas Institute of Theology in St. Louis in 2009, and others in 2010 from Saint Louis University and from University of Missouri–St. Louis.

Two April 2024 events in St. Louis marked the centennial of her birth. The Archdiocese of St. Louis' Office of Black Catholic Ministries remembered her at a Mass on April 10, 2024, at St. Josephine Bakhita Catholic Church. The Sister Mary Antona Ebo, FSM Centennial Committee held a celebration on April 13, 2024, at St. Alphonsus Liguori “Rock” Catholic Church, where her funeral was held.
