= William Seward Burroughs I =

American inventor and businessman (1857–1898)

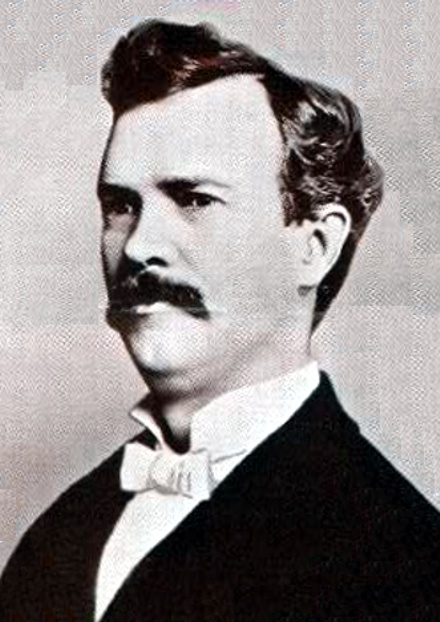
William S. Burroughs

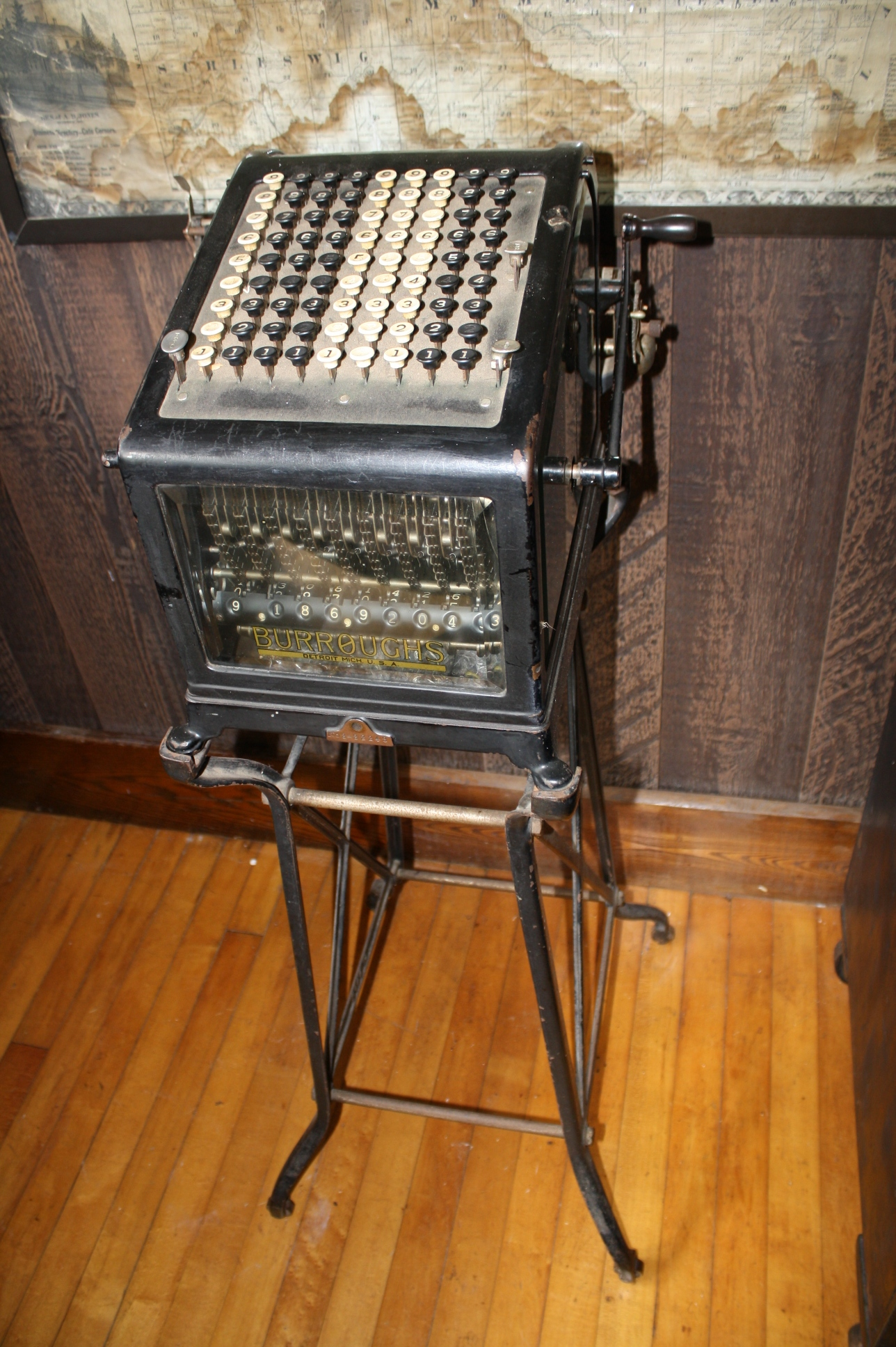
An early Burroughs adding machine

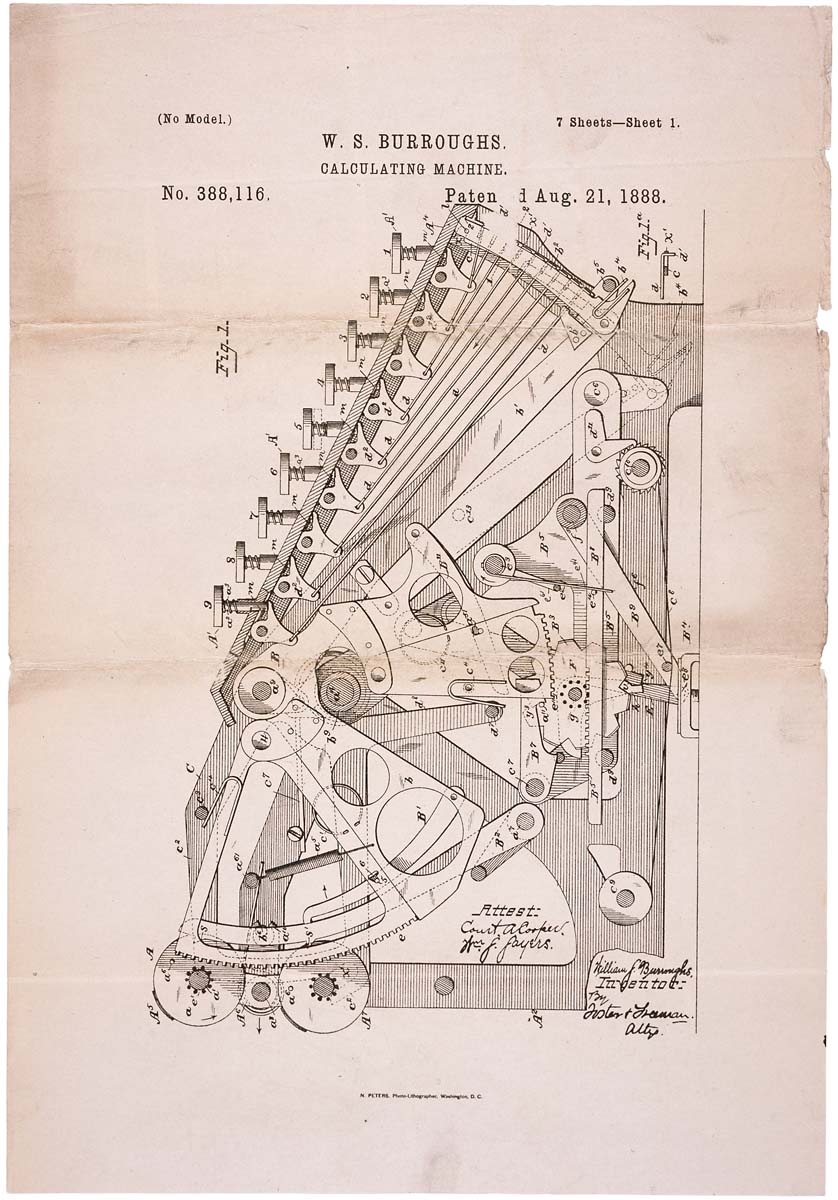
Patent no. 388,116 on a "calculating machine"

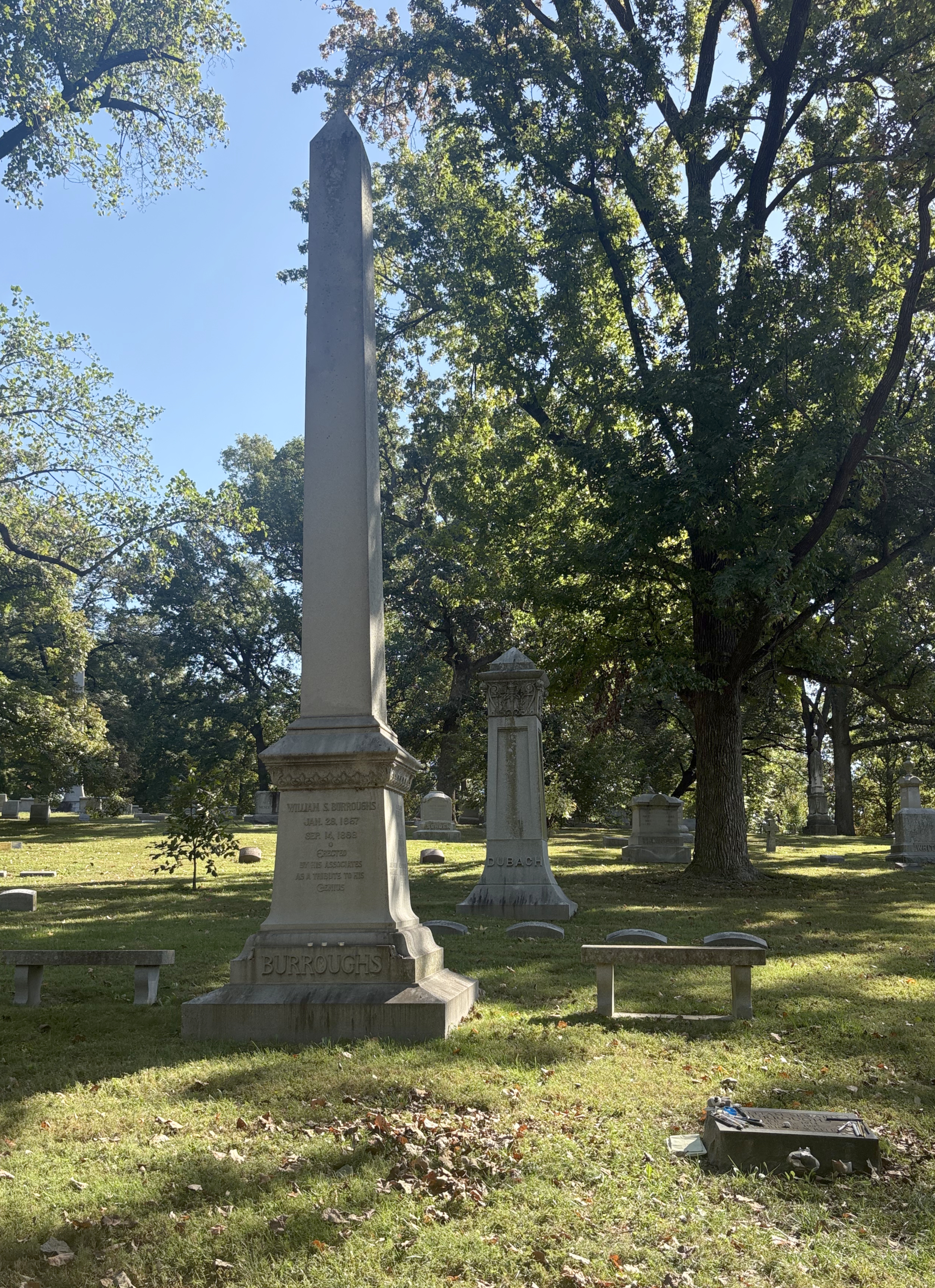
Burroughs' grave at Bellefontaine Cemetery. His grandson William's is in the lower right.

William Seward Burroughs I (January 28, 1857 – September 14, 1898) was an American inventor born in Rochester, New York, most prominently known as the inventor of a mechanical calculator.

== Life and career ==
=== Personal life ===
Burroughs was the son of a mechanic and worked with machines throughout his childhood. While a small boy, his parents moved to Auburn, New York, where he and his brothers were educated in public schools.

He married his wife, Ida (née Selover) in 1879. They had two sons and two daughters: Jennie, Horace, Mortimer (father of William S. Burroughs II), and Helen.

=== Inventor ===
In 1875, he started working as a bank clerk. Much of his job consisted of laboriously reviewing ledgers for errors. Burroughs then became interested in developing an adding machine. At the bank, there had been a number of prototypes, but in inexperienced hands, they would sometimes give incorrect answers. Burroughs did not find his clerical work agreeable, as he was fond of mechanics. He resigned after seven years working as a clerk.

In the early 1880s, Burroughs was advised by a doctor to move to an area with a warmer climate. He moved to St. Louis, Missouri where he worked in the Boyer Machine Shop. These new surroundings hastened the development of an existing idea: an adding machine. His new job gave him the opportunity to build his prototype. Accuracy was the foundation of his work. He made his design drawings on metal plates to prevent distortion.

Burroughs filed his first patent for the invention of a "calculating machine" in 1885. It was designed to ease the monotony of clerical arithmetic. By 1890, they were well known in the banking industry, and adoption spread.

== Company founder ==
Burroughs founded the American Arithmometer Company in 1886. After his death, in 1904 partner John Boyer renamed the business the Burroughs Adding Machine Company.

He was awarded the Franklin Institute's John Scott Legacy Medal shortly before his death. He was posthumously inducted into the National Inventors Hall of Fame. He was the grandfather of Beat Generation writer William S. Burroughs and great-grandfather of William S. Burroughs Jr., who was also a writer.

Burroughs also received a patent for an electric alarm clock in 1892.

He died in Citronelle, Mobile County, Alabama and was interred in Bellefontaine Cemetery in St. Louis, Missouri.

== Patents ==
- U.S. patent 388,116 Calculating-machine. Filed January 1885, issued August 1888.
- U.S. patent 388,117 Calculating-machine. Filed August 1885, issued August 1888.
- U.S. patent 388,118 Calculating-machine. Filed March 1886, issued August 1888.
- U.S. patent 388,119 Calculating-machine. Filed November 1887, issued August 1888.
- Electric alarm clock. Issued February 1892.
- Calculating machine. Issued week ending September 5, 1893
