= Aquinas Institute of Theology =

Catholic seminary in St. Louis, US

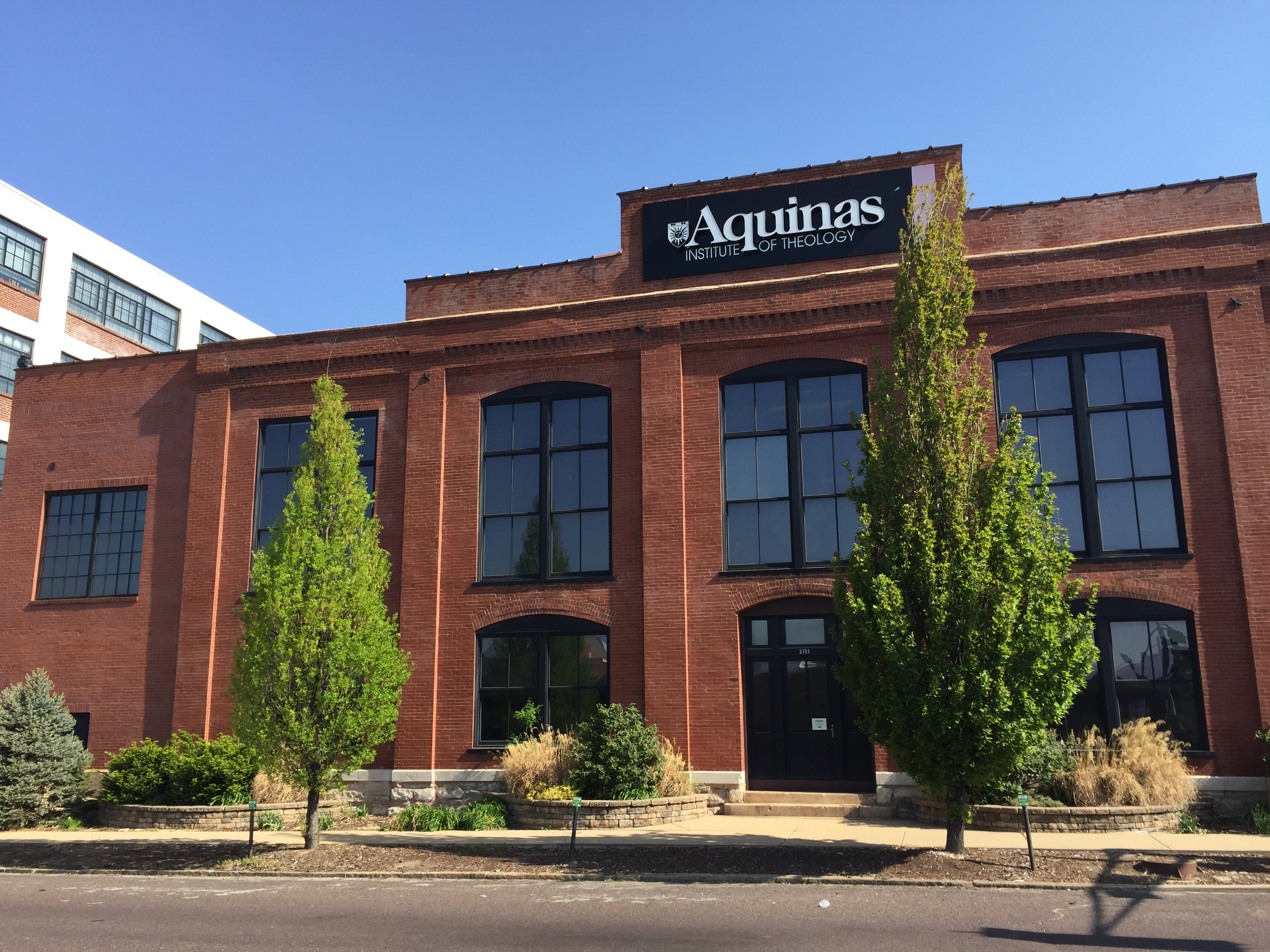
- Type: Private graduate school and seminary
- Established: 1925; 101 years ago
- Accreditation: Association of Theological Schools
- Affiliations: Roman Catholic (Dominican)
- President: Vincent Dávila, OP, PhD
- Academic staff: 8 (fall 2025)
- Students: 107 (fall 2025)
- Location: St. Louis, Missouri, United States; 38.6343°N 90.2379°W
- Campus: Urban
- Website: ai.edu

The Aquinas Institute of Theology is a Catholic graduate school and seminary in St. Louis, Missouri. It was founded by the Dominican Order and is sponsored by the Province of St. Albert the Great.

== Academics ==
The institute offers a number of graduate degrees in theology and ministry, including a Master of Arts in Theology (M.A.), a Master of Divinity (M.Div.), and a Master of Arts in Pastoral Studies (MAPS).

Aquinas Institute is accredited by the Association of Theological Schools in the United States and Canada.

== Community offerings ==
In addition to its academic programs Aquinas Institute offers several community programs. The director of the institute's continuing education program in the 1980s was writer and counselor Darlene Halpin.

== History ==
1956 - The two Dominican colleges, St. Rose of Lima and the Studium Generale, are incorporated as one, the Aquinas Institute of Philosophy and Theology.

1964 - Aquinas Institute is accredited by the North Central Association of Colleges and Secondary Schools.

1965 - The Association of Theological Schools of Iowa is formed, the first ecumenical consortium established in the country.

1967 - The first women students begin their studies.

1968 - Aquinas Institute becomes one of the first five Catholic schools to enter the Association of Theological Schools in the United States and Canada and to be accredited by it.

1981 - Aquinas Institute of Theology moves to St. Louis, Missouri, where it enters into a "Cooperative Project for Theological Education" with Saint Louis University, on whose campus it resides. During that time, the school inaugurates the Great Preacher Award (awarded to an outstanding homilist in the St. Louis area), the Catherine of Siena Excellence in Ministry Award (awarded to a layman who has contributed through ministerial work), and the annual Aquinas Lecture (given by leading theologians on current topics in theology). The Dubuque campus is sold to Emmaus Bible College.

2005 - The school moves again, this time to a former factory in Midtown St. Louis, built in 1903 to house the Standard Adding Machine Company, which prospered with the invention of a 10-key adding machine. The renovation of the building was part of a larger urban renovation project which includes residential and commercial space.

== Notable alumni ==
Mary Antona Ebo (1978), first African-American woman head of a Catholic hospital
