= Stefan Mozar =

Australian electrical engineer

Stefan Mozar is an electrical engineer who lives in Australia. He was named a Fellow of the Institute of Electrical and Electronics Engineers (IEEE) in 2015 for his development of safety solutions for electronic equipment. He studied engineering at the University of New South Wales (UNSW), Sydney, Australia, and did his doctoral work at UNSW and Okayama University, Japan. His work has resulted in patents, inventions, and publications. He has received many awards, including the IEEE Millennium Medal, the David Robinson Award from Engineers Australia, and the Richard Emberson Award from IEEE.
