= David A. Hodges =

American electrical engineer (1937–2022)

David Albert Hodges (August 25, 1937 – November 18, 2022) was an American electrical engineer, digital telephony pioneer, and professor of electrical engineering at the University of California, Berkeley.

Hodges was elected a member of the National Academy of Engineering in 1983 for innovative contributions to integrated circuit design techniques and their application to data and signal processing.

== Education and career ==
Hodges received his B.E.E. degree from Cornell University in 1960, and his M.S. (1961) and Ph.D. (1966) from Berkeley. From 1966-1970 he worked at Bell Laboratories in Murray Hill and Holmdel, NJ. In 1970 he joined the faculty in Electrical Engineering and Computer Sciences at UC Berkeley, where he has served as professor, department chair, and dean.

He helped establish metal–oxide–semiconductor (MOS) devices as a practical technology for telephony applications, which led to the rapid development and wide adoption of pulse-code modulation (PCM) digital telephony. The MOS mixed-signal integrated circuit, which combines analog and digital signal processing on a single chip, was developed by Hodges with Paul R. Gray at UC Berkeley in the early 1970s. In 1974, Hodges and Gray worked with R.E. Suarez to develop MOS switched capacitor (SC) circuit technology, which they used to develop the digital-to-analog converter (DAC) chip, using MOSFETs and MOS capacitors for data conversion. The silicon-gate CMOS (complementary MOS) PCM codec-filter chip, developed by Hodges and W.C. Black in 1980, has since been the industry standard for digital telephony.

== Personal life and death ==
Hodges was born in 1937 in Hackensack, New Jersey. His parents were alumni of Cornell University, and his father was an electrical engineer. He had two younger sisters.

Hodges met his wife, Susan Spongberg, during his graduate studies in electrical engineering at UC Berkeley, and they married in 1965.

Hodges died on November 18, 2022, at the age of 85.

== Awards ==
Hodges is a member of the National Academy of Engineering and an IEEE Fellow. He received the 1999 ASEE Benjamin Garver Lamme Award, 1997 IEEE James H. Mulligan, Jr. Education Medal, and, with Robert W. Brodersen and Paul R. Gray, the 1983 IEEE Morris N. Liebmann Memorial Award for pioneering work on switched capacitor circuits. Received the IEEE Richard M. Emberson Award in 2017.
