= Miklós Vig =

Hungarian musician (1898–1944)

- Miklós Vig

Background information
- Also known as: Miklós Vig
- Born: Miklós Voglhut; 11 July 1898; Budapest, Austria-Hungary
- Origin: Hungary
- Died: 19 December 1944 (aged 46) Budapest, Hungary

Miklós Vig (11 July 1898 – 19 December 1944) was a Hungarian cabaret and jazz singer, actor, comedian and theater secretary in the 1920s, 1930s, and 1940s. Born in Budapest on 11 July 1898, he was murdered there on 19 December 1944 by members of the Arrow Cross Party.

== Background and biography ==
=== Early life ===
Vig was born Miklós Voglhut in 1898 to Vilmos Vogelhut (1867-1942) and Roza Vogelhut (1870-1942) in a Hungarian Jewish family in Budapest, Hungary. Although he went to acting school, he had better success as a cabaret singer. In 1924 as his career was picking up he changed his surname to Vig, because Voglhut was a Jewish-sounding name and antisemitism was growing at the time. Vig means cheerful or merry in Hungarian.

=== Family ===
Other musicians from the Vig family include Vig's brother, saxophone and clarinet player György Vig, and his nephew, jazz musician Tommy Vig. Another nephew, John Vig, is a physicist and was president of the Institute of Electrical and Electronics Engineers in 2009.

=== Murder ===
The fact that Vig was married to a Catholic woman, Kató Szőke, and the fact that he changed his name, did not save him from the Holocaust. On 19 December 1944 he was among a group of Jews who were bound, lined up along the banks of the Danube and machine-gunned into the river by Hungarian Nazis, members of the Arrow Cross Party. The Shoes on the Danube Promenade commemorates those who were murdered in this fashion.

== Music and comedy ==
1920's-era Intim Kabaré Poster advertising performances by Miklós Vig

Vig had his first major successes as a soloist, and later performed frequently in other cabarets including the Budapest Operetta Theatre and Budapest Orfeum. Although he made many recordings, he became most famous as a singer of popular music on the radio. A 1935 article in Színházi Élet described Vig as a singer of popular sentimental songs.

According to Gramofon (the Hungarian Jazz and Classical music magazine), Vig was considered part of the first generation of recorded Hungarian musicians. When Deutsche Gramophone found themselves falling behind the competition, they signed Vig, who became their first dance-music star.

As a comedian, he performed in the early 1920s at various cabarets including the Rakéta Kabaré, occasionally with female partner Annus Nagy.

== Discography ==
Date of Release	Title	Label
1929	Akácvirág akácvirág	Polydor
	Álmodtam az éjszaka	
	Délután mosogatás után	Polydor
1929	Egyszer voltam a bálban...	Polydor
1938	Én nem tudom már, hogy minek becézzelek...	Radiola
1929	Éppen csak a szivem fáj	Polydor
1929	Éva keringö	Polydor
1929	Feketeszemű kis párom	
1929	Gyöngyvirág	Polydor
1938	Hallod te ló...	Radiola
1929	Hej, Kikelt ucca 3!	
	Hogy is tudtam eddig élni nélküled	
	Illúzió a szerelem	
1929	Jönnél te még...	Polydor
1929	Kadarka nóta	Polydor
1929	Konstantinápoly	Polydor
1929	Lesz-e párom már a nyáron?	Polydor
1929	Madridban	Polydor
1929	Maga rég nem lesz a világon	Polydor
1929	Majd ha újra sírni tudsz...	Ervé
1927	Malvin, ne húzza el a derekát	
1929	Messze van a Mester ucca	Polydor
1929	Minden lány csak Wiener Walzert járt	Polydor
1931	Minden ugy lesz, ahogy te kivánod	Polydor
	Minden veréb tudja	Polydor
	Mondd, nem kívánsz te túl sokat	
1929	Mostanában mind a bárban...	Ervé
1929	Nekem nem kell szerelem	Polydor
	Őszi Fekete fellegek	
1929	Pici piros, kicsi csókos szája	
1931	Sose jön egy szebb	Polydor
1929	Szép volt...	Polydor
1929	Szeresd a régi muzsikát	Polydor
1929	Szervusz	Polydor
	Szibill levele	
1938	Szombat vasárnap	Radiola
1930	Szomorú nyárfalevél	Polydor
1929	Tarka Lepkém	Polydor
	Tubicám	Polydor
	Valamit a kis fülébe	Polydor
1929	Valami van magában...	Polydor
1930	A vén Tabánban	Polydor
1929	Vig Miklósnak jó kedve van	Polydor
1929	A Volga rabja (Ey uchnjem)...	Polydor
