= Standard Adding Machine Company =

- Standard Adding Machine Building
- U.S. National Register of Historic Places
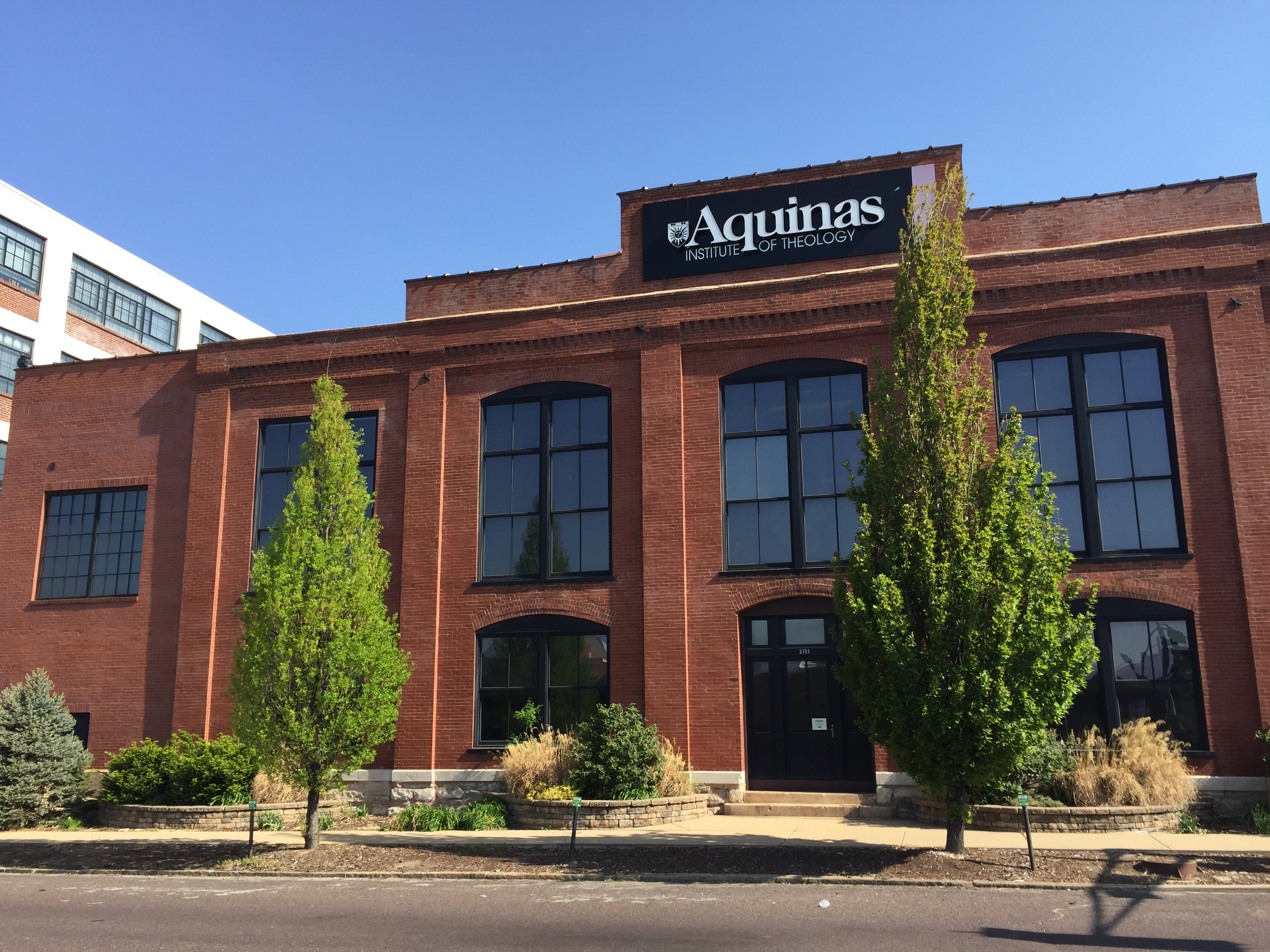
- The building of Standard Adding Machine Company was renovated, and is now the home of Aquinas Institute of Theology

- Location within St. Louis Location within Missouri Location within the United States
- Location: 3701 Forest Park Blvd., St. Louis, Missouri
- Coordinates: 38°38′9″N 90°14′17″W
- Area: less than one acre
- Built: 1903
- Architect: G.N. Hinchman
- Architectural style: Industrial
- NRHP reference No.: 05001328
- Added to NRHP: November 25, 2005

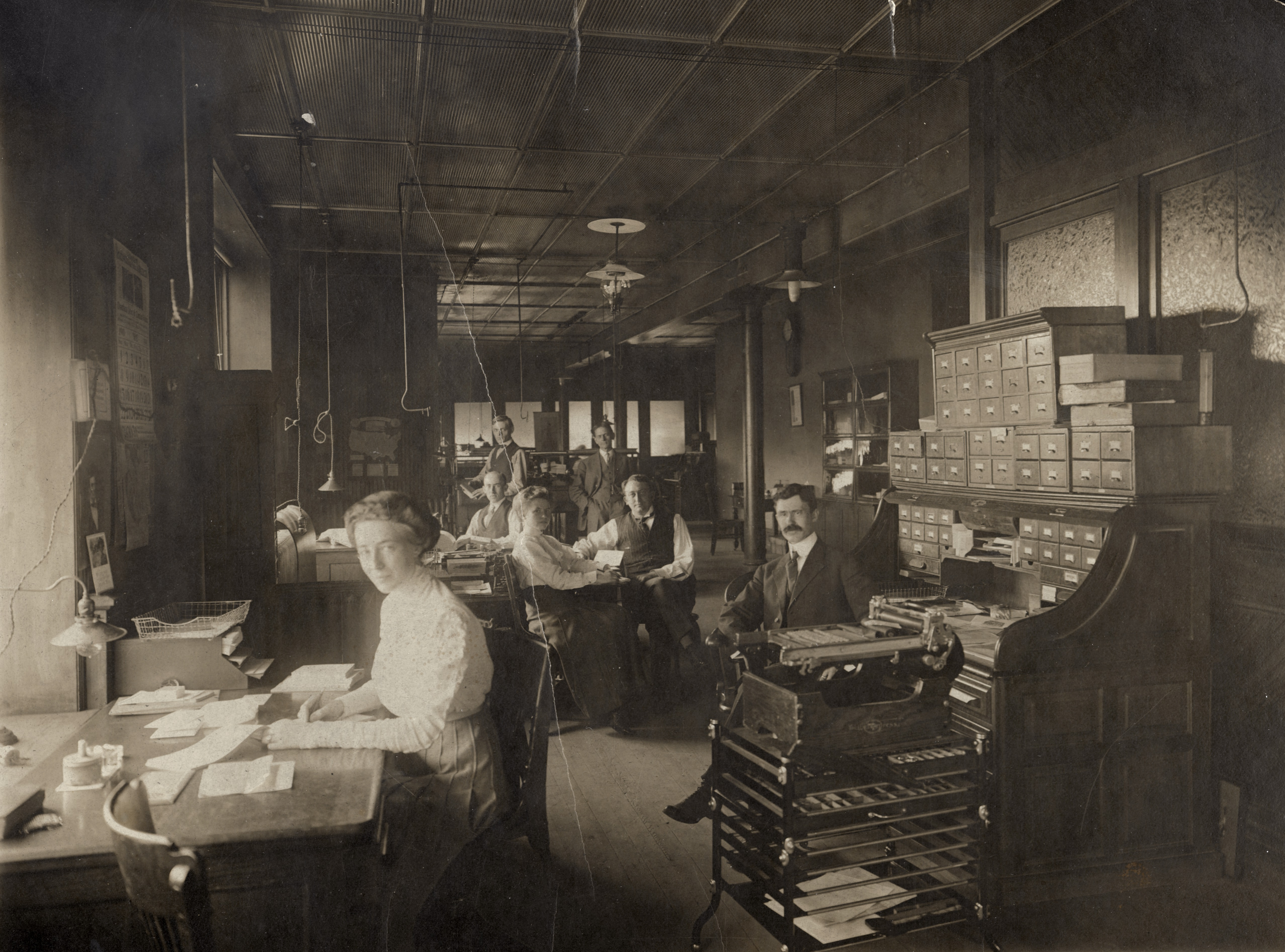
Women and Men Working in Office at Standard Adding Machine Company, 3701 Forest Park Boulevard, May 1910

Standard Adding Machine Company was founded in the early 1890s (first records are from 1892) in Illinois and was the first company to (successfully) release a 10-key adding machine. The machine was a breakthrough for its time because it dramatically modernized computing. Earlier key driven adding machines, like the comptometer, featured eight or more columns of nine keys, which made them cumbersome and costly and their operators prone to mistakes. The 10 keys were set on a single row.

The invention won an international grand prize during the 1904 World's Fair and was heralded as a "modern life preserver" in an office journal.

== History ==
William H. Hopkins, the inventor of the Standard Adding Machine, was a minister. When he moved to St. Louis in 1885 he served as chaplain and then pastor of St. Louis Second Christian Church. He continued to invent during those years and to find better ways to make an adding machine. In the 1890s, he left Second Christian Church and became assistant editor of the company that published The Christian Evangelist. William Hopkins filed his first patent on October 4, 1892. He registered the Hopkins Adding Machine Company in 1897, and in 1899 his company changed name to Standard Adding Machine Company (Illinois company was bought off).

The Standard Adding Machine Company released the first 10-key adding machine in about 1900. Hopkins' success led to competition. By 1915, other adding machine companies were vying for business. In 1916, Hopkins died, and his company began to decline.

Standard Adding Machine closed in 1921. In the decades since, the building housed businesses such as St. Louis Pump & Equipment Co., Lee Paper Co., and most recently, Harrison-Williams Store Fixtures. Vacant since 2003, the building was renovated in 2005 by Aquinas Institute of Theology.

== Recognition ==
Because of the historical significance of the adding machine, the Standard Adding Machine building is listed on the National Register of Historic Places.
