= John Vig =

American physicist (born 1942)

John R. Vig
- Vig János
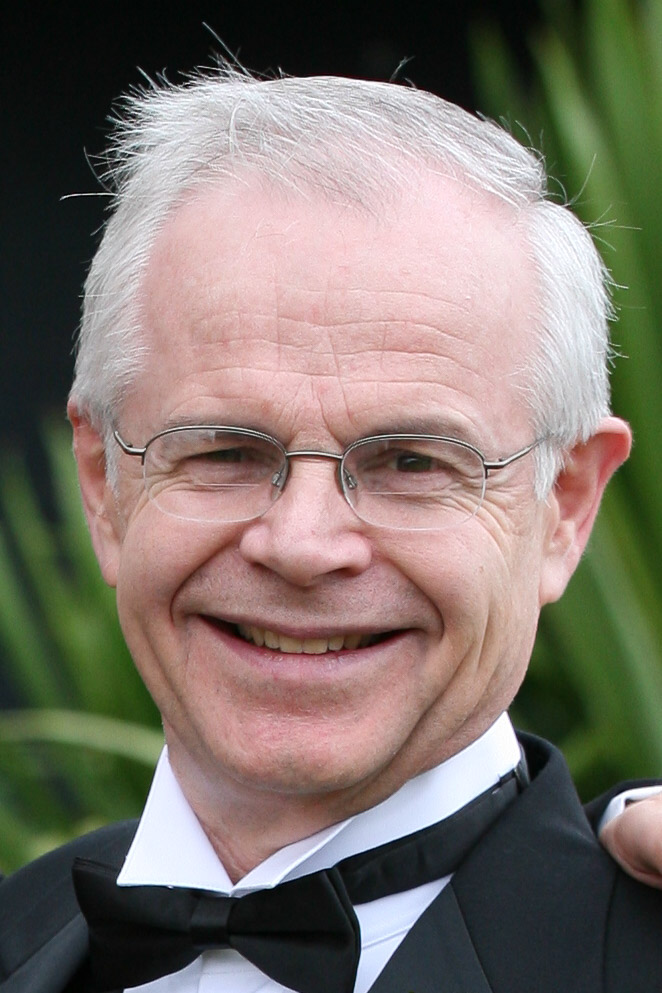
- Born: 31 May 1942 (age 83); Budapest, Hungary
- Education: B.S., M.S., Ph.D.
- Alma mater: The City College of New York, B.S.; Rutgers, The State University of New Jersey, Ph.D.
- Occupation: Physicist
- Known for: UV-ozone cleaning, Chemical polishing of quartz surfaces, Polyimide bonding of resonators, Noise in MEMS, Tutorial on quartz resonators
- Relatives: Miklos Vig
- Awards: 2020 IEEE Richard M. Emberson Award, 2006 C.B. Sawyer Memorial Award, 1990 IEEE UFFC Cady Award
- Scientific career
- Fields: Physics
- Institutions: U.S. Army Research Lab, Fort Monmouth, New Jersey, U.S.
- Thesis: The Kondo effect in some dilute magnetic alloys of zinc (1969)
- Doctoral advisor: Prof. Bernard Serin

John Vig (born 31 May 1942) is a physicist, executive and inventor. His career has been with the U.S. Army Research Lab and he has also been active with the IEEE. He is known for his inventions in UV-ozone cleaning, chemical polishing of quartz surfaces, polyimide bonding of resonators and noise in MEMS.

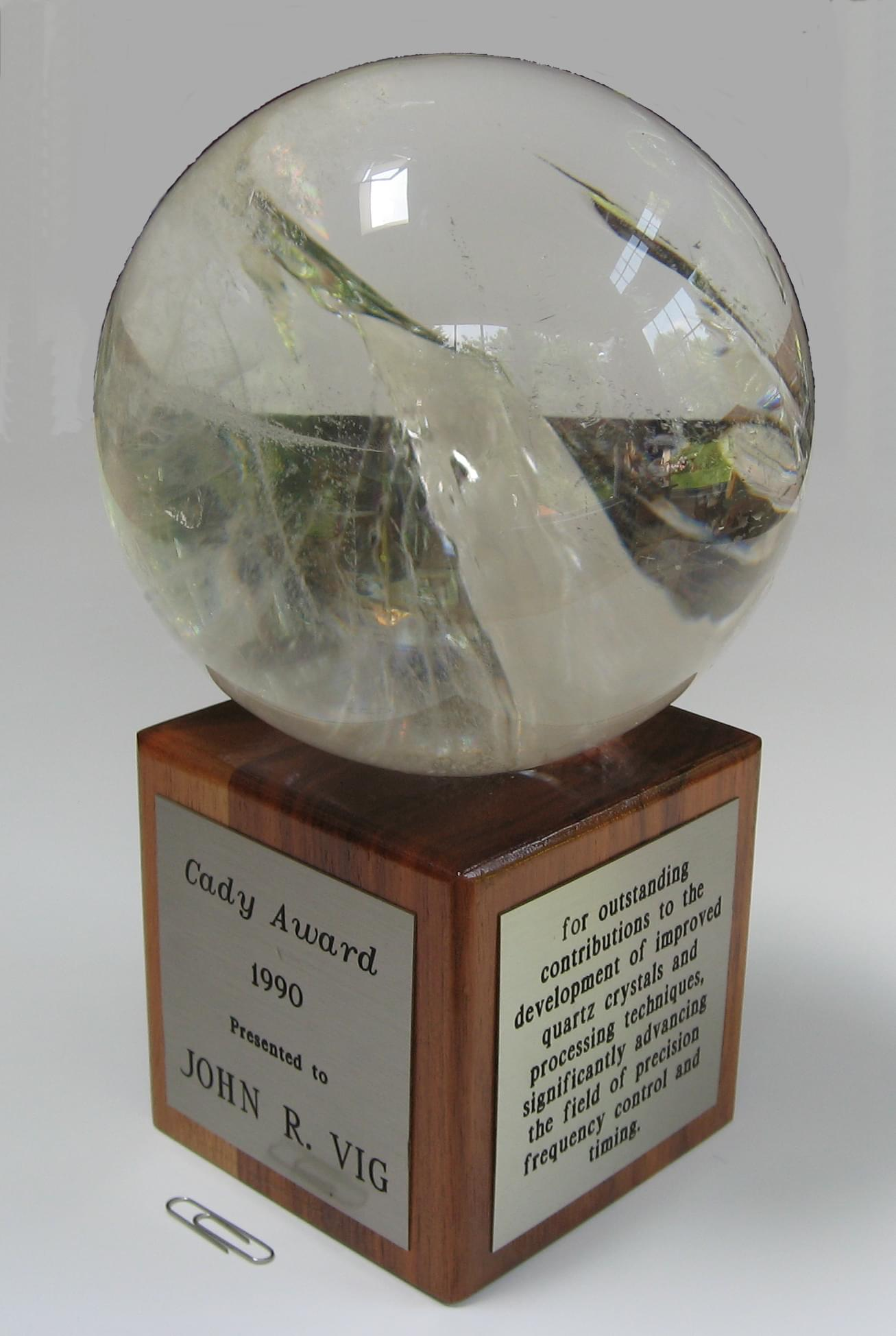
1990 IEEE UFFC Cady Award, a crystal ball made of single-crystal quartz, Presented to John R. Vig for outstanding contributions to the development of improved quartz crystals and processing techniques significantly advancing the field of precision frequency control and timing

== Early life and education ==
Born in Budapest to a Jewish family during World War II, he survived The Holocaust and left Hungary with his immediate family during the Hungarian Revolution in 1956. He settled in New York City with his family in 1957 and subsequently received a B.S. degree from City College New York in 1964. In 1969 he received a Ph.D. in Physics from Rutgers University. After graduating he began his professional career at the Electronic Components Laboratory at Fort Monmouth.

== Career ==
He has served the IEEE in multiple roles, including:

- IEEE President and CEO.
- President of the Ultrasonics, Ferroelectrics, and Frequency Control Society (UFFC-S)
- Founding President of the Sensors Council
- Division Director, Member of the Board of Directors

He was elected Fellow of the IEEE in 1988 "for contributions to the technology of quartz crystals for precision frequency control and timing."

While in senior management roles in the IEEE, John focused heavily on key issues affecting the organization as demographics, technologies and globalization shifted the environment in which it operated. A key example was the management of diversity as the membership shifted away from being primarily a US-based organization. Another example was helping to kick-start the IEEE Internet of Things Journal after having founded the IEEE Sensors Journal.

One of the IEEE Sensors Council's awards, the John Vig Meritorious Service Award, is named after John.
