= James M. Tien =

James M. Tien, Ph.D., DEng (h.c.), is distinguished professor and former dean of the University of Miami College of Engineering. He has worked previously at Bell Laboratories, Rand Corporation and Rensselaer Polytechnic Institute.

== Higher education ==
Institutional

- Massachusetts Institute of Technology (MIT), Ph.D., Systems Engineering & Operations Research, 1972
- MIT, E.E., Electrical & Systems Engineering, 1970
- MIT, S.M., Electrical & Systems Engineering, 1967
- Rensselaer Polytechnic Institute (RPI), B.E.E, Electrical Engineering, 1966

== Awards and honors ==
In 2001, he was elected a member of the National Academy of Engineering or contributions to the development and application of systems engineering concepts and methodologies to improve public services and engineering education. He received the 2010 IEEE Richard M. Emberson Award, “for vision and leadership in advancing IEEE’s global visibility and recognition as an innovator in technical, publication and educational services.” He was elected to the 2002 class of Fellows of the Institute for Operations Research and the Management Sciences.

== Publications ==
=== Recent popular articles ===
"Science, technology key to U.S. growth," Miami Herald, 12/04/2009

=== Most recent refereed journal articles ===
- J. M. Tien, Y. Lee, "An Extended Dynamic Least Loaded Routing Strategy for Multi- Destination Traffic in Telecommunication Networks", IEEE/ACM Transactions on Networking, 2009
- J. M. Tien, P. Goldschmidt-Clermont, "Healthcare: a Complex Service System", Journal of Systems Science and Systems Engineering, vol. 18, No. 4, pp. 285–310, 2009
- J. M. Tien, P. J. Goldschmidt-Clermont, "Engineering Healthcare As A Service System", Journal of Information-Knowledge-Systems Management (Also online at www.IKSMOnline.com, vol. 8, Nos. 2–4, 2009
- J. M. Tien, "Services: A System's Perspective", IEEE Systems Journal, vol. 2, No. 1, pp. 146–157, 2008
- J. M. Tien, "On Integration and Adaptation in Complex Service Systems", Journal of Systems Science and Systems Engineering, vol. 17, No. 4, pp. 385–415, 2008

=== Refereed books ===
- (13 Co-Authors), Assessing Medical Preparedness To Respond To A Terrorist Nuclear Event, Institute of Medicine Committee, Washington, DC: The National Academies Press, 2009
- (13 Co-Authors), Harnessing Systems Engineering to Improve Traumatic Brain Injury Care in the Military Health System, Institute of Medicine & National Academy of Engineering Committee, Washington, DC: The National Academies Press, 2009
- National Research Council (13 Co-Authors), Intelligent Sustainment and Renewal of Department of Energy Facilities and Infrastructure, Washington, DC: The National Academies Press, 2005
- D. Berg, J. M. Tien, W.A. Wallace (Co-Editors), Management of Technology in the Services Industry, Special Issue of IEEE Transactions on Engineering Management, vol. 48, No. 3, 2001
- (13 Co-Authors), Governor's Committee to Review Audio-Visual Covera: An Open Courtroom: Cameras in New York Courts, New York, NY: Fordham University Press, 1997
