= Adding machine =

Type of mechanical calculator designed to perform basic arithmetic

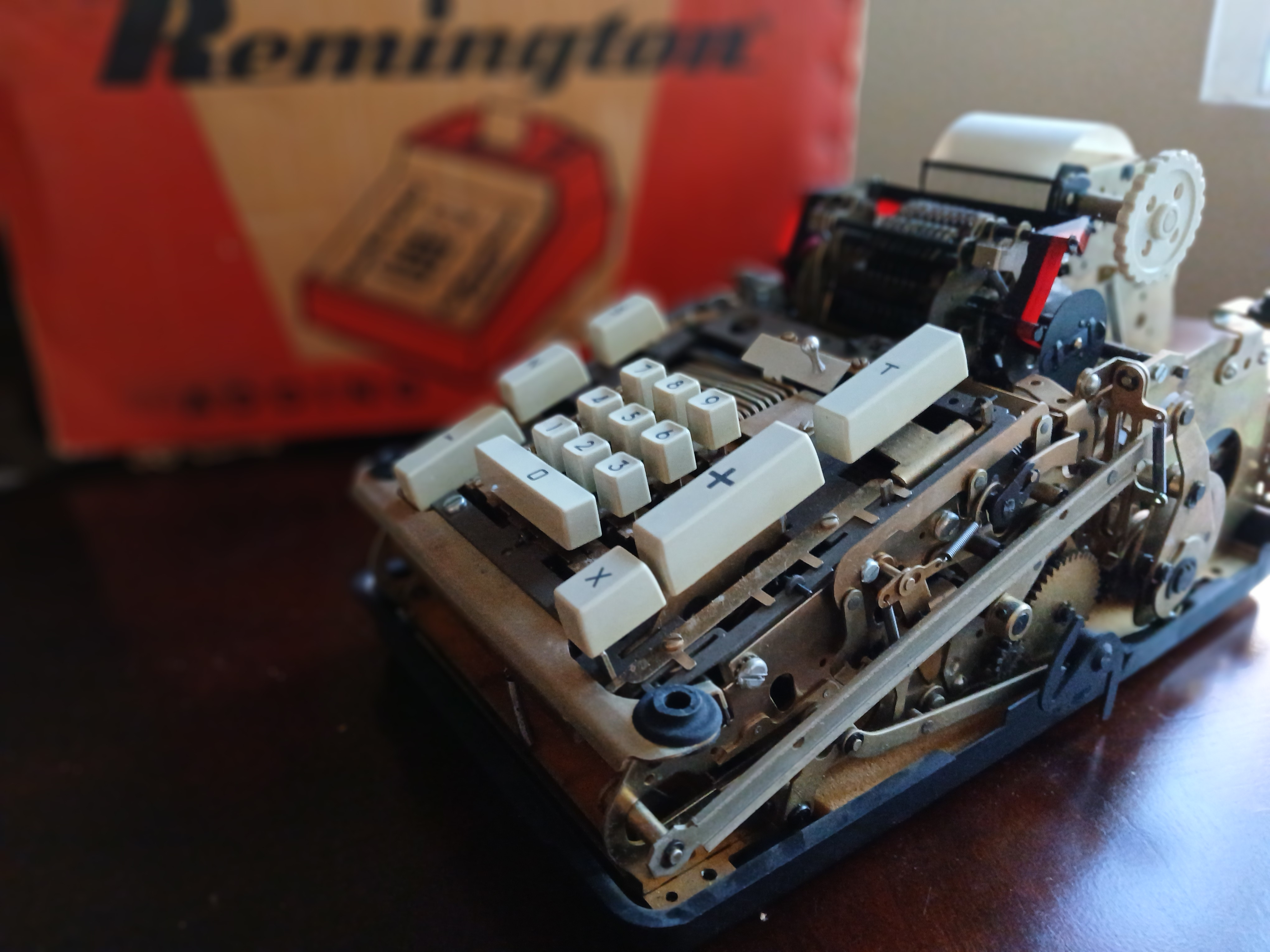
- A Remington Rand adding machine alongside its original cardboard box
- Type: Mechanical calculator
- Introduced: 19th century (commercial production)
- Discontinued: 1980s (phased out by electronic calculator)
- Predecessor: Pascaline
- Successor: Electronic calculator
- Design firm: Various manufacturers
- Date invented: 1642
- Invented by: Blaise Pascal, Wilhelm Schickard

Calculator
- Entry mode: Manual crank and keyboard input
- Precision: Limited by digit capacity (commonly 8–12 digits)
- Display type: Mechanical rotary wheels

Other
- Power consumption: Manual (hand-crank), some electromechanical models
- Weight: Varies, typically 5–15 kg

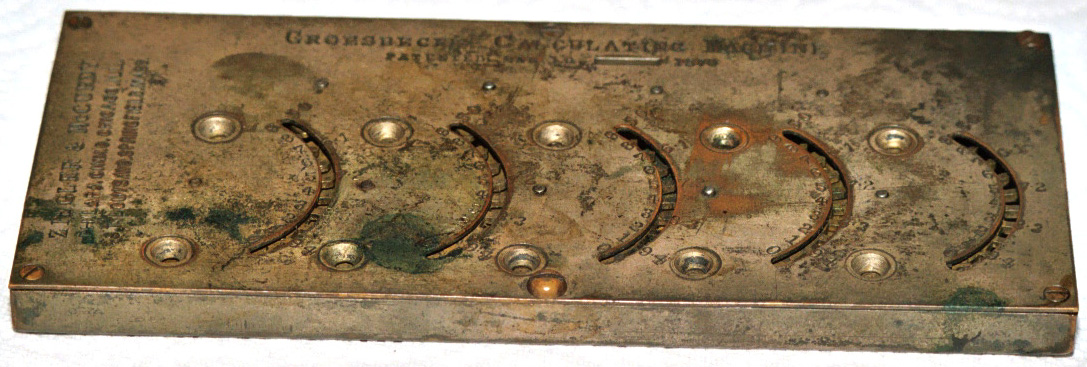
An older adding machine. Its mechanism is similar to a car odometer.

An adding machine is a class of mechanical calculator, usually specialized for bookkeeping calculations. Consequently, the earliest adding machines were often designed to read in particular currencies. Adding machines were ubiquitous office equipment in developed countries for most of the twentieth century.

They were phased out in favor of electronic calculators in the 1970s and by personal computers beginning in about 1985.

Blaise Pascal and Wilhelm Schickard were the two original inventors of the mechanical calculator in 1642. For Pascal, this was an adding machine that could perform additions and subtractions directly and multiplication and divisions by repetitions, while Schickard's machine, invented several decades earlier, was less functionally efficient but was supported by a mechanised form of multiplication tables. These two were followed by a series of inventors and inventions leading to those of Thomas de Colmar, who launched the mechanical calculator industry in 1851 when he released his simplified arithmometer (it took him thirty years to refine his machine, patented in 1820, into a simpler and more reliable form). However, they did not gain widespread use until Dorr E. Felt started manufacturing his comptometer (1887) and Burroughs started the commercialization of differently conceived adding machines (1892).

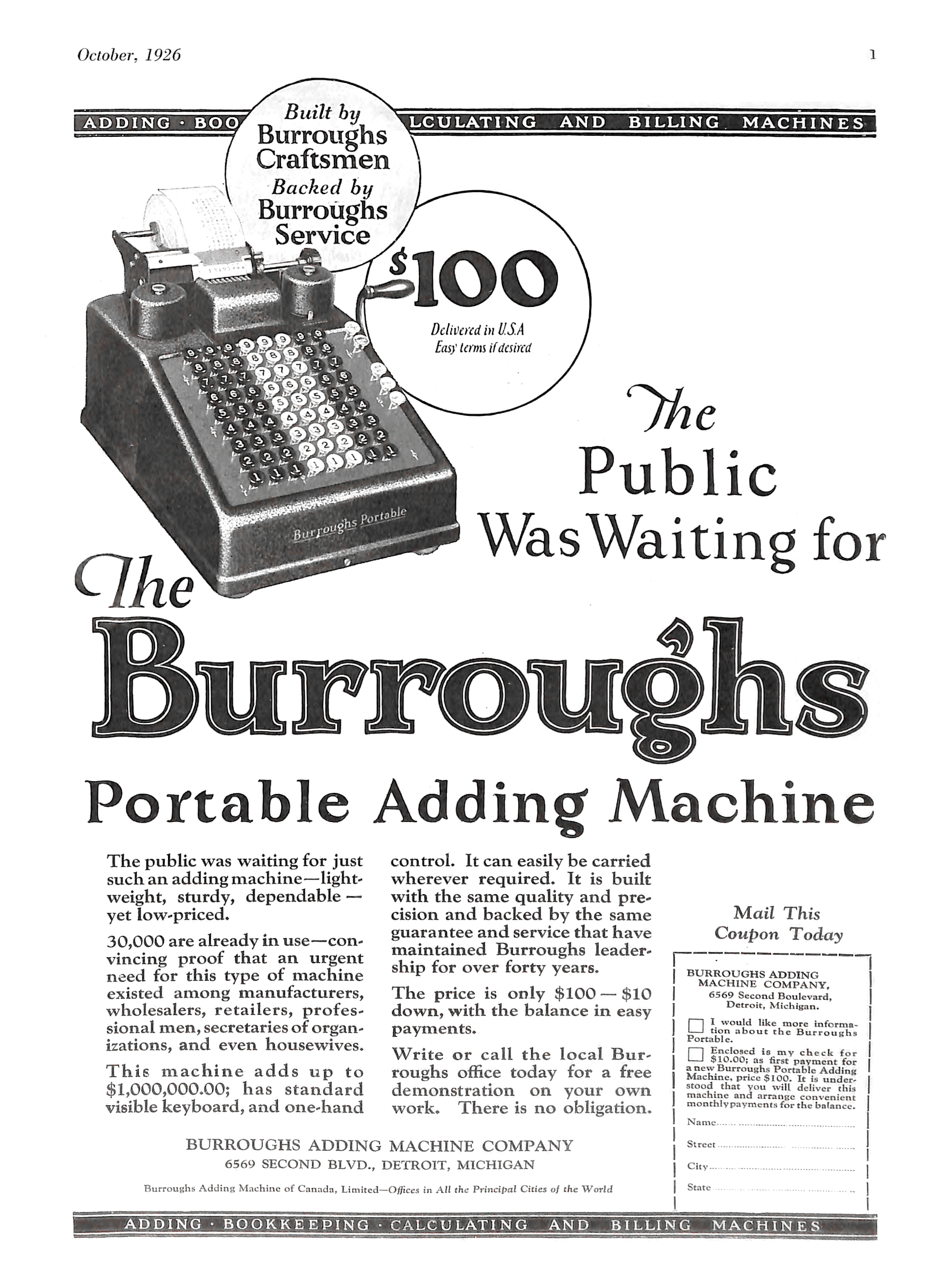
Advertisement for Burroughs adding machine, 1926

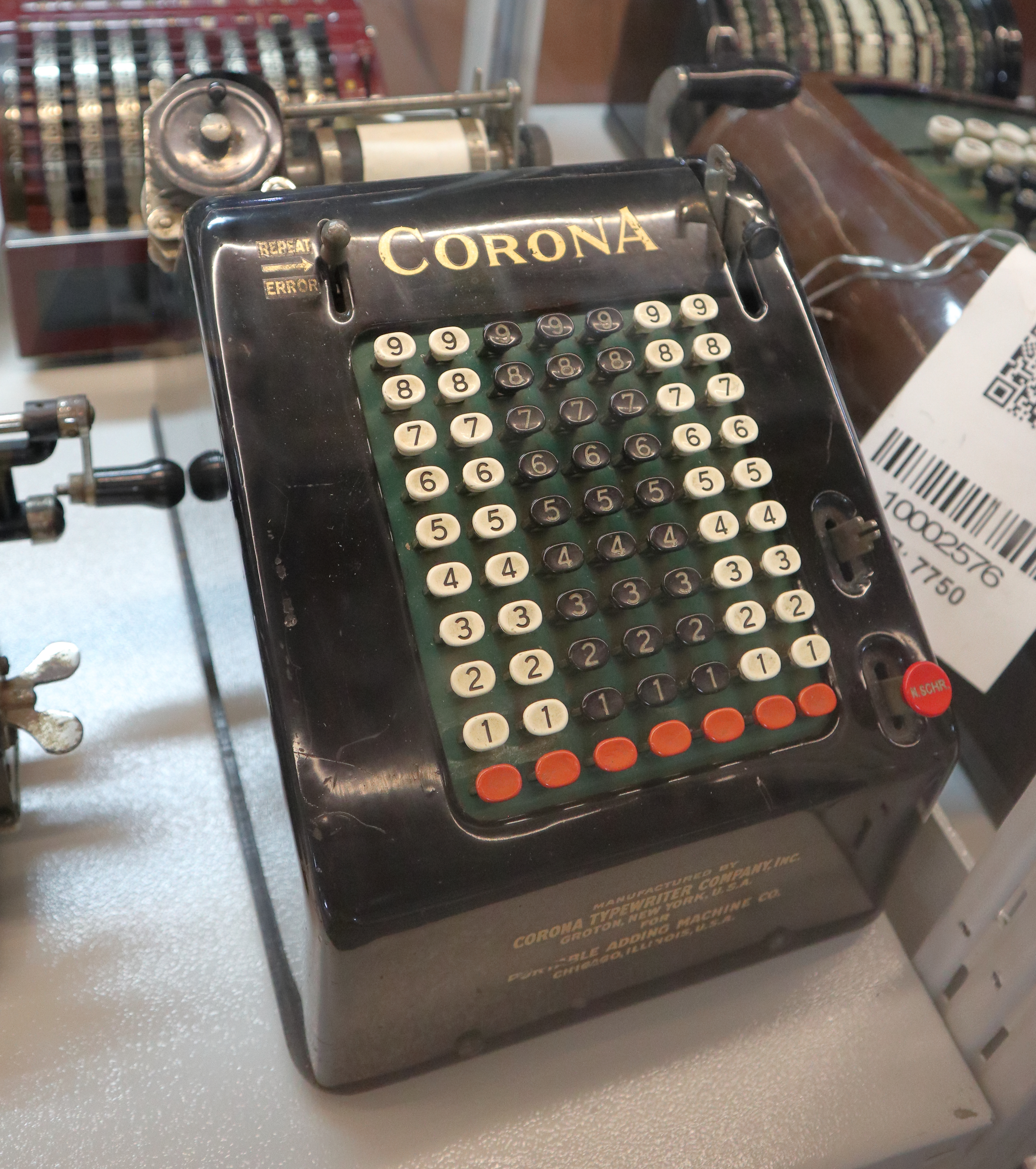
Corona Portable adding machine exhibited in Moscow

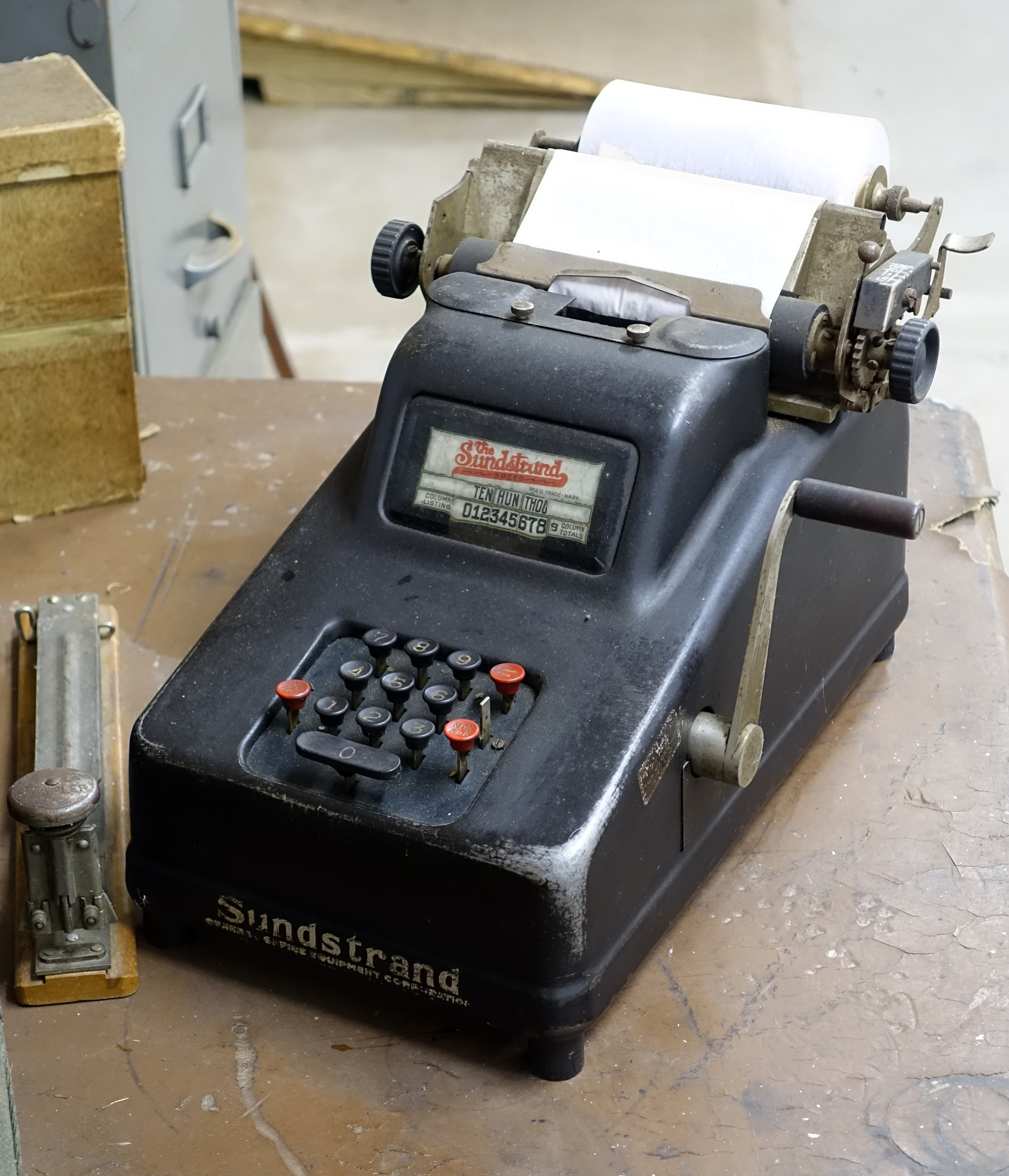
Sundstrand adding machine at Civilian Conservation Corps Museum, Connecticut

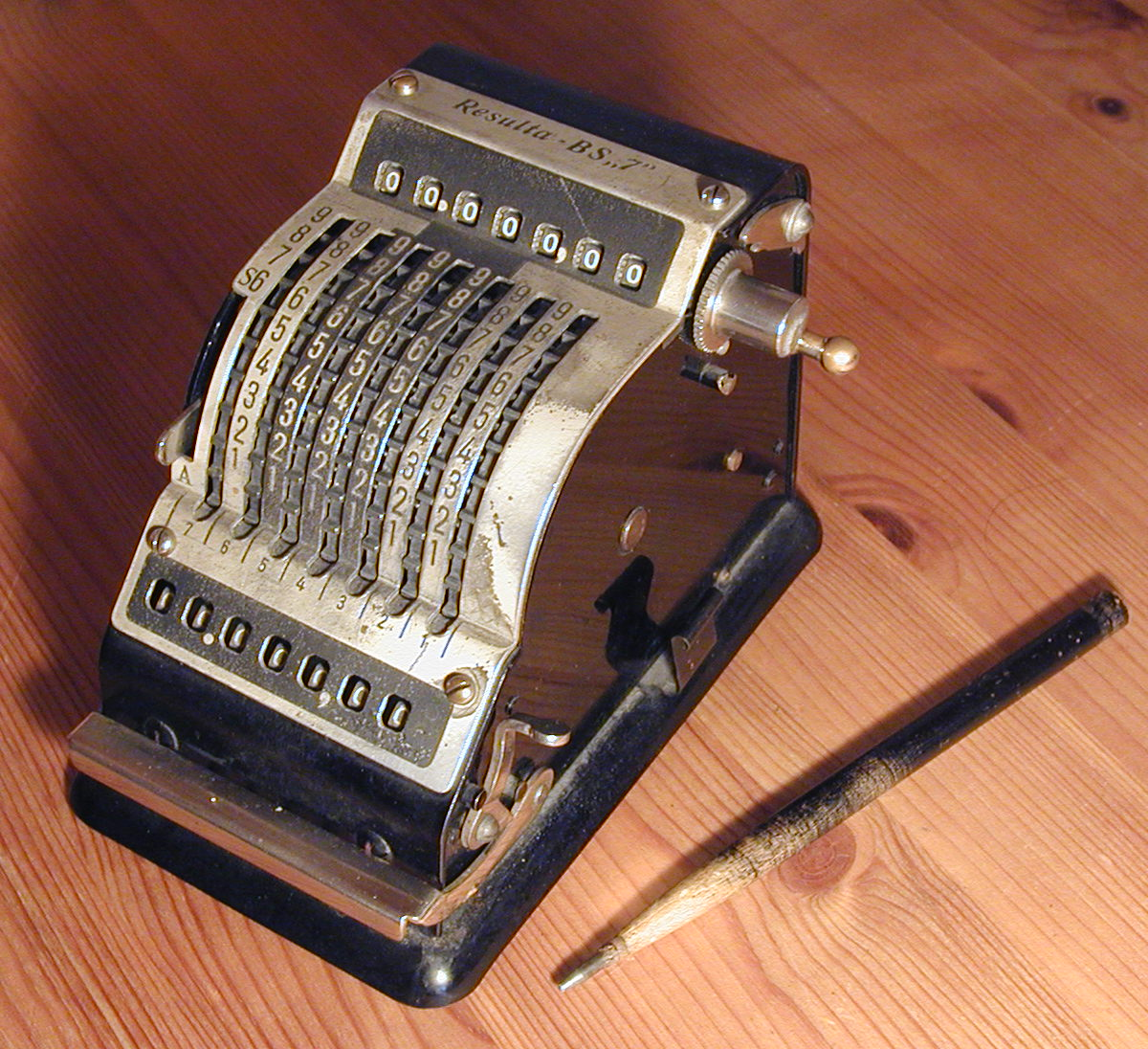
A Resulta - BS 7 adding machine

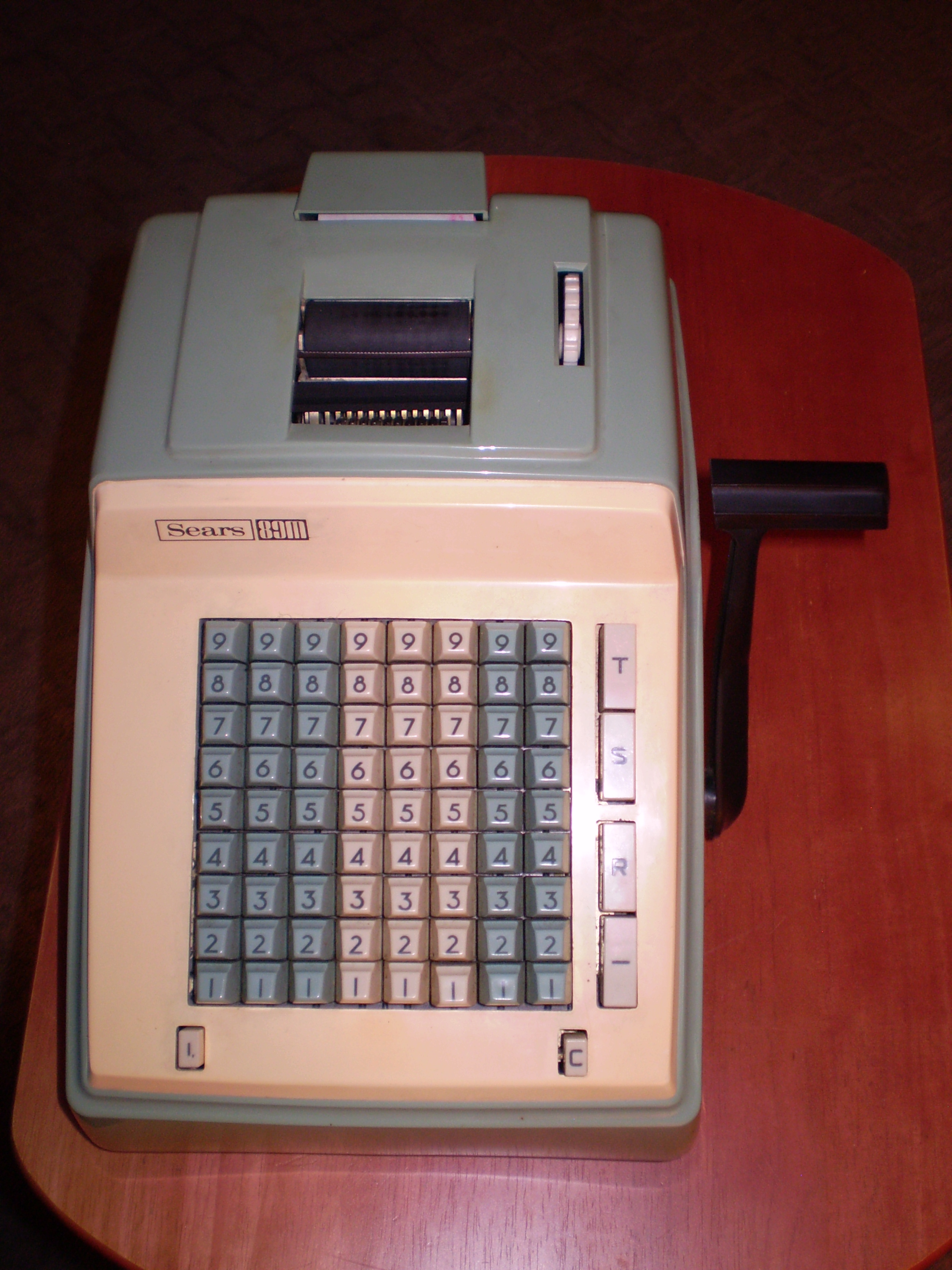
Sears 89M

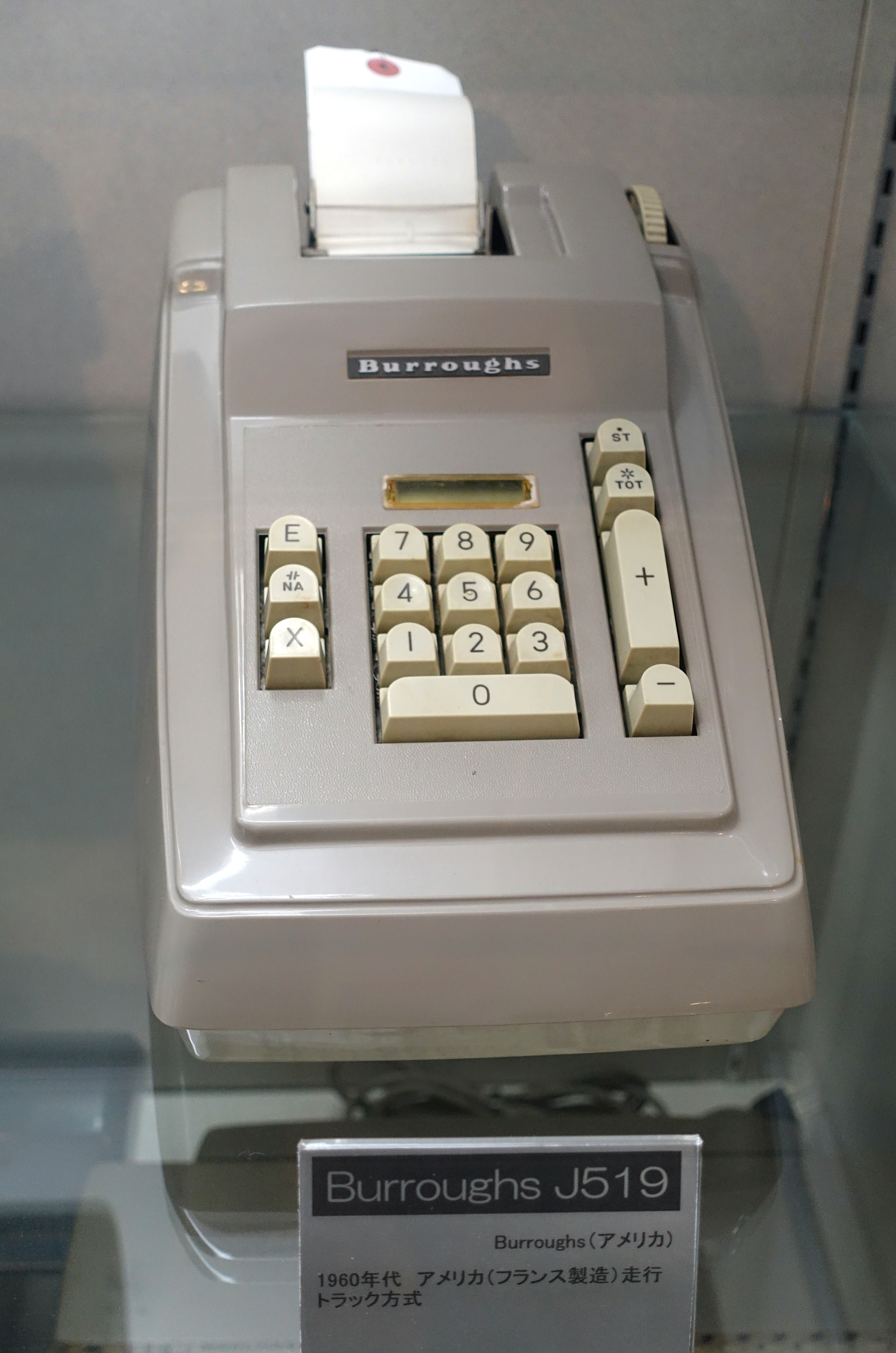
Burroughs J519 at Ridai Museum, Tokyo

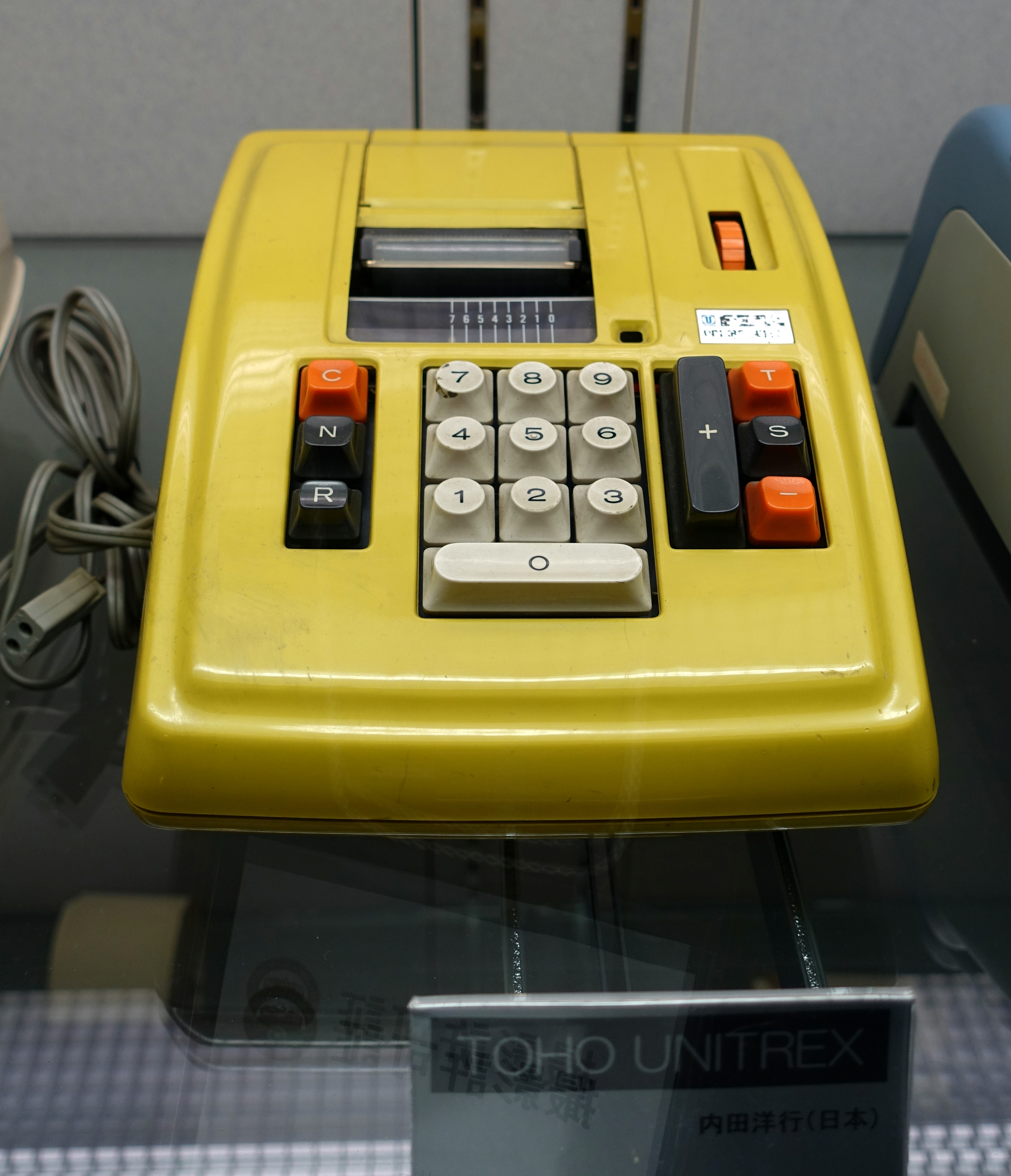
Toho Unitrex electromechanic, Ridai Museum, Tokyo

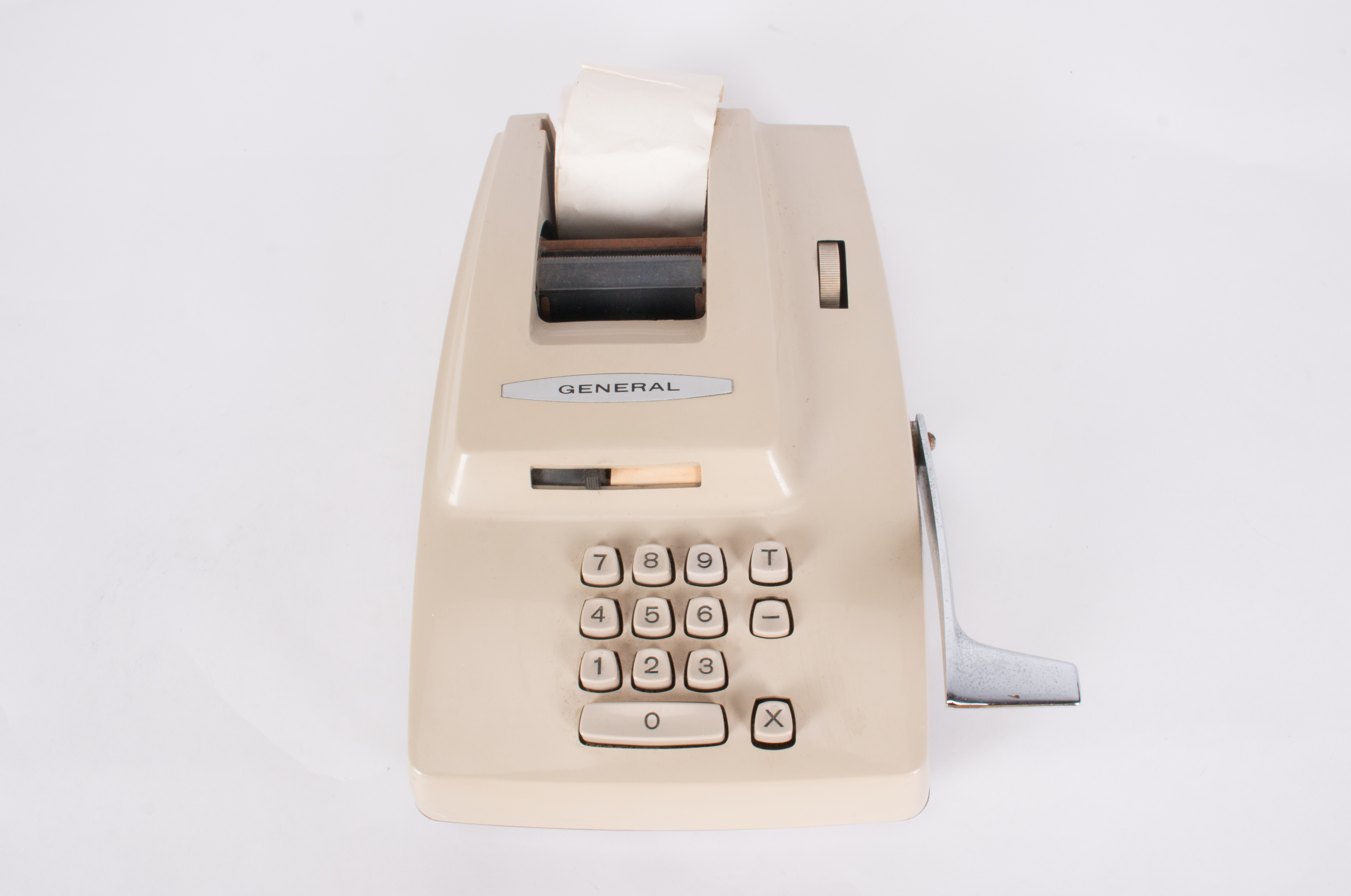
Vintage adding machine

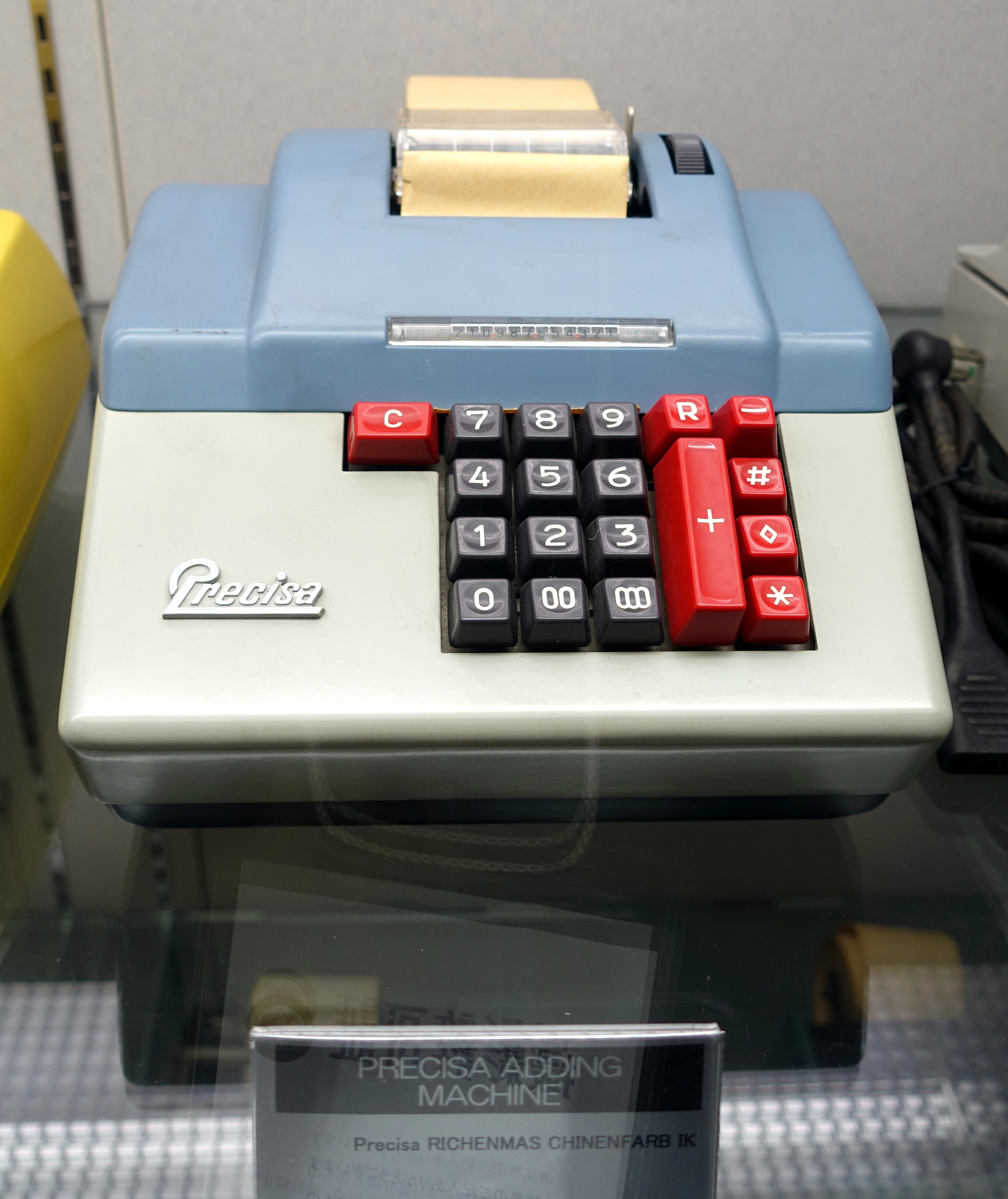
Precisa electromechanic Ridai Museum, Tokyo

== Operation ==
To add a new list of numbers and arrive at a total, the user was first required to "ZERO" the machine. Then, to add sets of numbers, the user was required to press numbered keys on a keyboard, which would remain depressed (rather than immediately rebound like the keys of a computer keyboard or typewriter or the buttons of a typical modern machine). The user would then pull the crank, which caused the numbers to be shown on the rotary wheels, and the keys to be released (i.e., to pop back up) in preparation for the next input. To add, for example, the amounts of 30.72 and 4.49 (which, in adding machine terms, on a decimal adding machine is 3,072 plus 449 "decimal units"), the following process took place: Press the 3 key in the column fourth from the right (multiples of one thousand), the 7 key in the column second from right (multiples of ten) and the 2 key in the rightmost column (multiples of 1). Pull the crank. The rotary wheels now showed 3072. Press the 4 key in the third column from the right, the 4 key in the second column from right, and the 9 key in the rightmost column. Pull the crank. The rotary wheels now show a running 'total' of 3521, which, when interpreted using the decimal currency colour-coding of the key columns, equates to 35.21. Keyboards typically did not have or need 0 (zero) keys; one simply did not press any key in the column containing a zero. Trailing zeros (those to the right of a number) were there by default because when a machine was zeroed, all numbers visible on the rotary wheels were reset to zero.

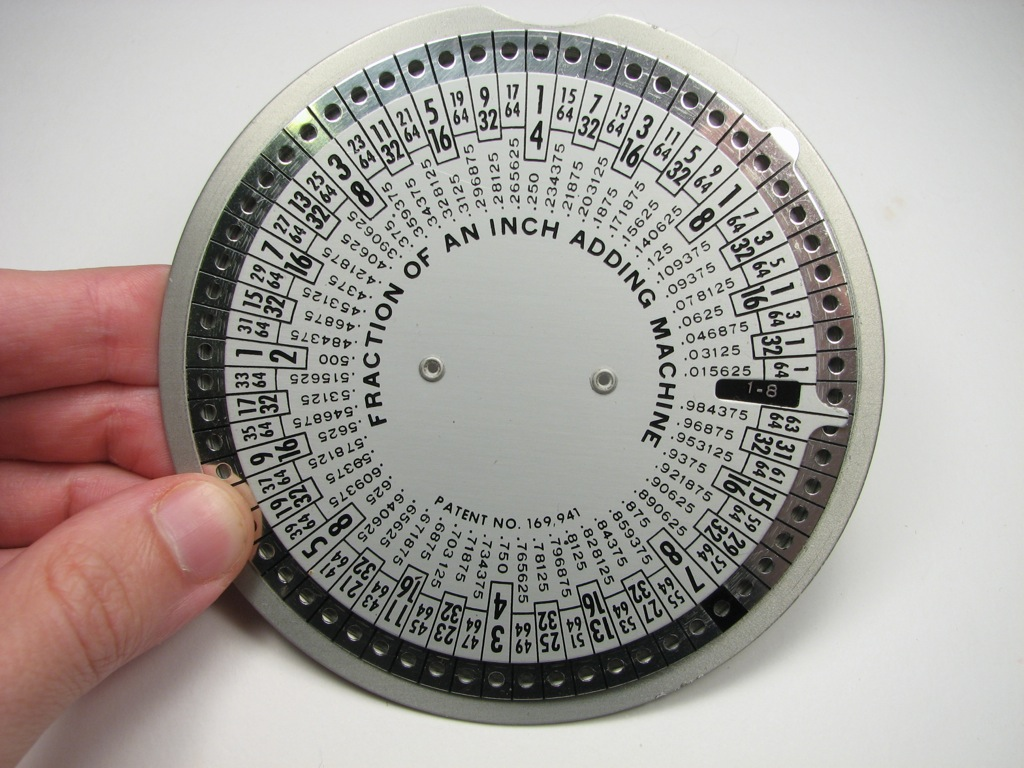
A manual adding machine manufactured in the 1950s.

Subtraction was impossible, except by adding the complement of a number (for instance, subtract 2.50 by adding 9,997.50).

Multiplication was a simple process of keying in the numbers zero or more columns to the left and repeating the "addition" process. For example, to multiply 34.72 by 102, key in 3472, pull the crank, and repeat once more. Wheels show 6944. Now key in 347200 = 3472x100 (3472 in columns 3 to 6 from the right, and nothing in columns 1 and 2 from the right), pull crank. Wheels now show 354144, or 3,541.44. To multiply by 102, 3 additions are required. To multiply by any number, the number of additions required is the sum of its digits.

A later adding machine, called the comptometer, did not require that a crank be pulled to add. Numbers were input simply by pressing keys. The machine was thus driven by finger power. Multiplication was similar to that on the adding machine, but users would "form" up their fingers over the keys to be pressed and press them down the multiple of times required. Using the above example, four fingers would be used to press down twice on the 3 (fourth column), 4 (third column), 7 (second column) and 2 (first column) keys. That finger shape would then move left two columns and press once. Usually, a small crank near the wheels would be used to zero them. Subtraction was possible by adding complementary numbers; keys would also carry a smaller, complementary digit to help the user form complementary numbers. Division was also possible by putting the dividend to the left end and performing repeated subtractions by using the complementary method.

Some adding machines were electromechanical – an old-style mechanism, but driven by electric power.

Some "ten-key" machines had input of numbers as on a modern calculator – 30.72 was input as 3, 0, 7, 2. These machines could subtract as well as add. Some could multiply and divide, although including these operations made the machine more complex. Those that could multiply used a form of the old adding machine multiplication method. Using the previous example of multiplying 34.72 by 102, the amount was keyed in, then the 2 key in the "multiplication" key column was pressed. The machine cycled twice, then tabulated the adding mechanism below the keyboard, one column to the right. The number keys remained locked down on the keyboard. The user now pressed the multiplication 0 key, which caused tabulation of the adding mechanism one more column to the right, but did not cycle the machine. Now the user pressed the multiplication 1 key. The machine cycled once. To see the total, the user was required to press a Total key, and the machine would print the result on a paper tape, release the locked down keys, reset the adding mechanism to zero, and tabulate it back to its home position.

Modern adding machines are like simple calculators. They often have a different input system, though.

To figure this out	Type this on the adding machine
2+17+5=?	2 + 17 + 5 + T
19-7=?	19 + 7 - T
38-24+10=?	38 + 24 - 10 + T
7×6=?	7 × 6 =
18/3=?	18 ÷ 3 =
(1.99×3)+(.79×8)+(4.29×6)=?	1.99 × 3 = + .79 × 8 = + 4.29 × 6 = + T

Note: Sometimes the adding machine will have a key labeled × instead of T. In this case, substitute × for T in the examples above. Alternatively, the plus key may continuously total instead of either a × or T key. Sometimes, the plus key is even labeled thus: (+)/=

== Burroughs's calculating machine ==
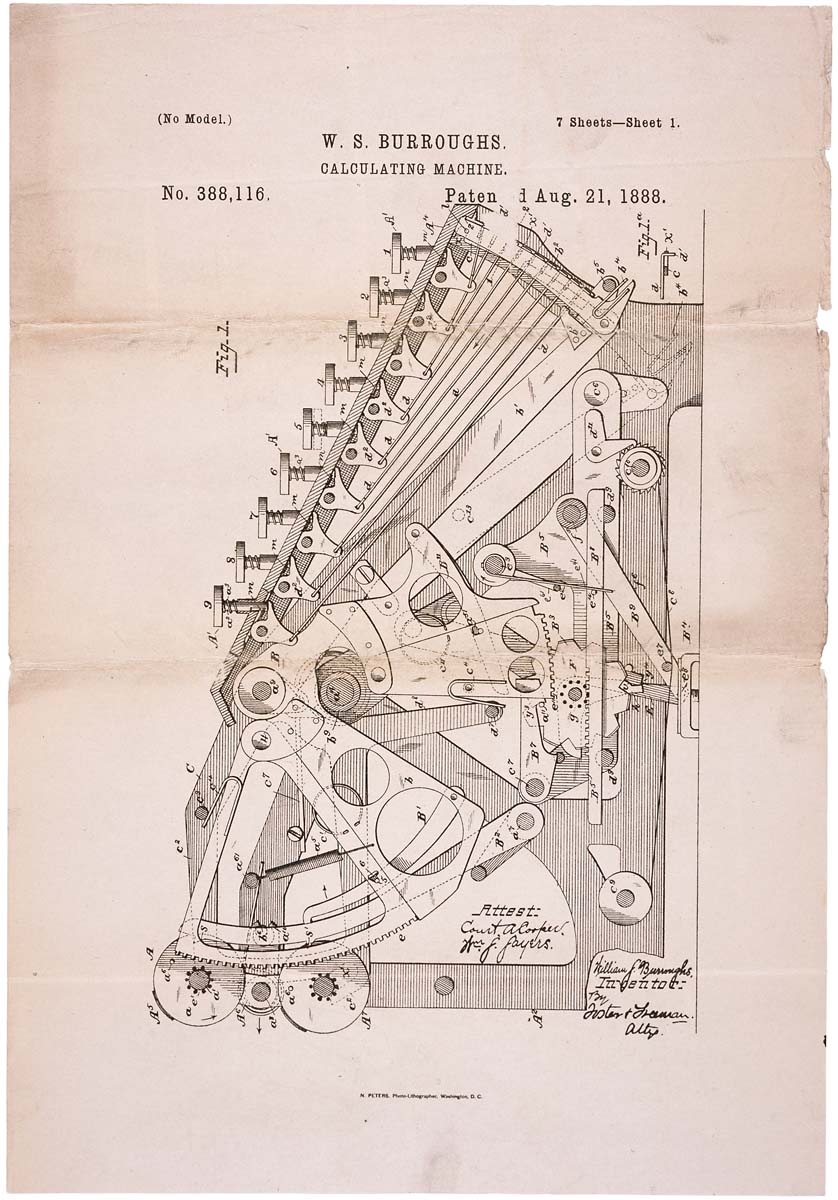
Patent drawing for Burroughs's calculating machine, 1888.

William Seward Burroughs received a patent for his adding machine on August 25, 1888. He was a founder of the American Arithmometer Company, which became Burroughs Corporation and evolved to produce electronic billing machines and mainframes, and eventually merged with Sperry to form Unisys. The grandson of the inventor of the adding machine is Beat author William S. Burroughs; a collection of his essays is called The Adding Machine.

== See also ==
- Adder (electronics)
- Cash register
- Standard Adding Machine Company

== Sources ==
- Marguin, Jean (1994). Histoire des instruments et machines à calculer, trois siècles de mécanique pensante 1642–1942 (in French). Hermann. ISBN 978-2-7056-6166-3.
- Taton, René (1963). Le calcul mécanique. Que sais-je ? n° 367 (in French). Presses universitaires de France. pp. 20–28.
