= Network Definition Language =

NDL (Network Definition Language) was a compiler on Burroughs Large and Medium Systems computers used to create a network definition file for a data communications controller (DCC) and object code for a data communications processor (DCP) that interfaced between a message control program (written in DCALGOL) such as (RJE), (MCSII) or (CANDE) and the computer's line adaptors and terminal network.

Burroughs Network Definition Language allowed many parameters of the mainframe communications adapter, modems (where used), protocol and attached terminal to be defined. However it treated the low-level operation of the multi-drop protocol, including the modulus of sequence numbers and the algorithm used for CRCs etc. as primitives.
