= Alan L. Davis =

American computer scientist (PhD 1972, Utah)

Al Davis
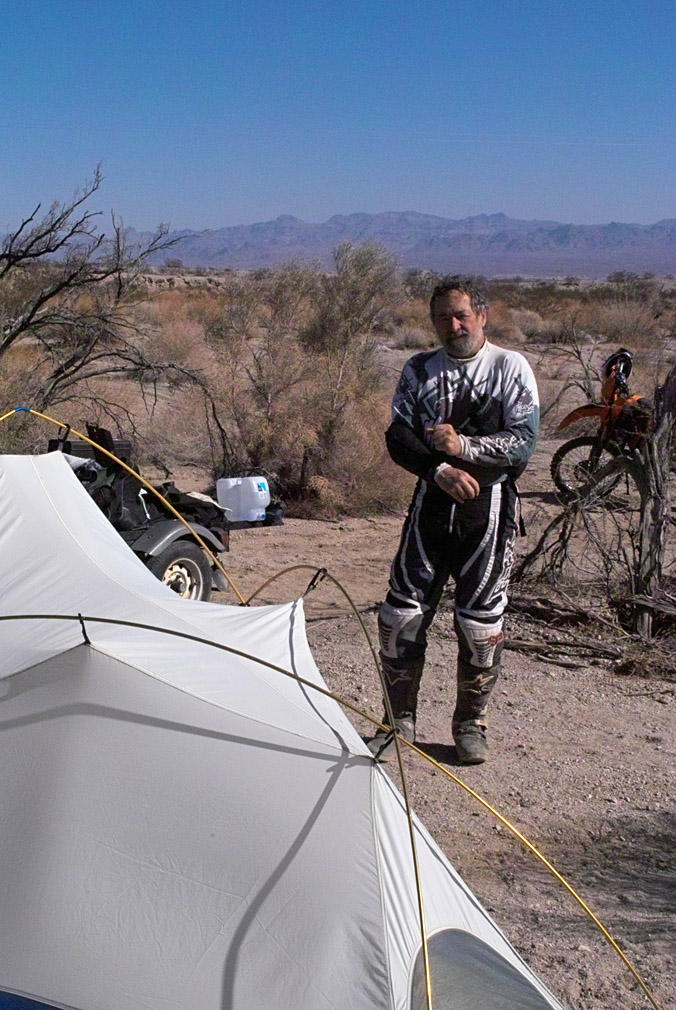
- Davis in the Nevada desert, November 2007
- Born: Salt Lake City, Utah
- Education: MIT; University of Utah
- Scientific career
- Fields: Computer science
- Workplaces: University of Utah; Schlumberger Palo Alto Research; Hewlett-Packard
- Thesis: SPL: A Structured Programming Language (1972)
- Doctoral advisor: Robert S. Barton

Alan Lynn Davis is an American computer scientist and researcher, a professor of computer science at the University of Utah, and served as the associate director of the University of Utah School of Computing.

Davis was raised in Salt Lake City, Utah. He received a bachelor's degree in electrical engineering at MIT in 1969, and a Ph.D. in computer science under Bob Barton at Utah in 1972.

With Bob Barton, in cooperation between Burroughs Corporation and Utah, Davis built the first operational dataflow or "data driven" computing machine, the DDM-1, between 1972 and 1976.

In the early 1980s, Davis left his tenured professor position at Utah to work for Schlumberger Palo Alto Research, where he headed the computer architecture group and developed the "FAIM-1" architecture. In 1988 he joined Hewlett-Packard labs in Palo Alto, where with Ken Stevens and Bill Coates he developed the "post office" switching architecture, a widely cited project.

He returned to the University of Utah School of Computing where he served as director of graduate studies in 2001 and as associate director since 2003, and has continued to do research with companies such as Intel and Hewlett-Packard.

Davis is mainly known for his work in computer architecture and asynchronous circuits, including influential work on arbiters. He has numerous technical publications and has supervised numerous Ph.D. dissertations.
