= Unitized Digital Electronic Computer =

Digital computer system

The Unitized Digital Electronic Computer (UDEC) was a digital computer system developed by the Burroughs Laboratory in the early 1950s. It was primarily located at and utilized by Wayne University in Detroit, Michigan. The machine was notable for its "unitized" construction, utilizing standardized electronic building blocks of packaged pulse circuits, which had been developed originally by Project Whirlwind, and also used for the Burroughs laboratory computer.

== Development and design ==
The UDEC was constructed at the Burroughs Research Center (Electronic Instruments Division) in Philadelphia.

The machine's design was based on "Unitized" Pulse-Control Equipment. These consisted of various types of packaged pulse circuits mounted on standard 19-inch relay racks. This modular approach allowed for a flexible means of logical design, where individual units acted as "building blocks" for the computer.

UDEC I specifications:

- Memory Words: Magnetic Cores 100, Magnetic Drum 5,300

== History and usage ==
The UDEC began regular operation around mid-1953. It was housed at the Wayne University Computation Laboratory, where it was used for machine computation courses and research.

At the time of its operation, it was one of several major computer projects monitored by the Office of Naval Research.

== See also ==
- Burroughs Corporation
