= Data descriptor =

In computing, a data descriptor is a structure containing information that describes data.

Data descriptors may be used in compilers, as a software structure at run time in languages like Ada or PL/I, or as a hardware structure in some computers such as Burroughs large systems with their descriptors.

Data descriptors are typically used at run-time to pass argument information to called subroutines. OpenVMS and Multics have system-wide language-independent standards for argument descriptors. Descriptors are also used to hold information about data that is only fully known at run-time, such as a dynamically allocated array.

== Examples ==
The following descriptor is used by IBM Enterprise PL/I to describe a character string:

| byte offset | +0 | +1 | +2 | +3 |
|---|---|---|---|---|
| 0 | descriptor type | string type | (res) | flags |
| 4 | maximum string length | | | |

- 'desc type' is 2 to indicate that this is an element descriptor rather than an array or structure descriptor.
- 'string type' indicates that this is a character or a bit string, with varying or non varying length. 2 indicates a non varying (fixed-length) character string.
- '(res)' is a reserved byte not used for character strings.
- 'flags' indicate the encoding of the string, EBCDIC or ASCII, and the encoding of the length of varying strings.
- 'maximum string length' is the actual length of the string for non varying strings, or the maximum length for varying strings.

Here is the source of an array descriptor from Multics. The definitions include a structure for the base array information and a structure for each dimension. (Multics ran on systems with 36-bit words).

dcl	1 array			        based    aligned,
	2 node_type		        bit(9)   unaligned,
	2 reserved		        bit(34)  unaligned,
	2 number_of_dimensions	        fixed(7) unaligned,
	2 own_number_of_dimensions	fixed(7) unaligned,
	2 element_boundary		fixed(3) unaligned,
	2 size_units		        fixed(3) unaligned,
	2 offset_units		        fixed(3) unaligned,
	2 interleaved		        bit(1)   unaligned,
	2 c_element_size		fixed(24),
	2 c_element_size_bits	        fixed(24),
	2 c_virtual_origin		fixed(24),
	2 element_size		        ptr unaligned,
	2 element_size_bits		ptr unaligned,
	2 virtual_origin		ptr unaligned,
	2 symtab_virtual_origin	        ptr unaligned,
	2 symtab_element_size	        ptr unaligned,
	2 bounds			ptr unaligned,
	2 element_descriptor	        ptr unaligned;

dcl	1 bound			        based aligned,
	2 node_type		        bit(9),
	2 c_lower			fixed(24),
	2 c_upper			fixed(24),
	2 c_multiplier		        fixed(24),
	2 c_desc_multiplier		fixed(24),
	2 lower			        ptr unaligned,
	2 upper			        ptr unaligned,
	2 multiplier		        ptr unaligned,
	2 desc_multiplier		ptr unaligned,
	2 symtab_lower		        ptr unaligned,
	2 symtab_upper		        ptr unaligned,
	2 symtab_multiplier		ptr unaligned,
	2 next			        ptr unaligned;

== See also ==
- Burroughs large systems descriptors
