= Elliott Organick =

American computer scientist (1925–1985)

- Born: February 25, 1925; Brooklyn, New York
- Died: December 21, 1985 (aged 60); Shreveport, Louisiana
- Education: University of Michigan B.S. M.S. Ph.D.
- Known for: Founder of ACM Special Interest Group on Computer Science Education
- Awards: SIGCSE Award for Outstanding Contribution to Computer Science Education (1985)
- Scientific career
- Workplaces: Manhattan Project; M. W. Kellogg Company; United Gas Corporation; University of Houston; University of Michigan; MIT CSAIL; University of Utah
- Thesis: Prediction of Hydrocarbon Vapor-Liquid Equilibria (1950)
- Doctoral advisor: Donald L. Katz; George Granger Brown

Elliott Irving Organick (February 25, 1925 – December 21, 1985) was a computer scientist and pioneer in operating systems development and education. He was considered "the foremost expositor writer of computer science", and was instrumental in founding the ACM Special Interest Group for Computer Science Education.

== Career ==
Organick described the Burroughs large systems in an ACM monograph of which he was the sole author, covering the work of Robert (Bob) Barton and others. He also wrote a monograph about the Multics timesharing operating system. By the mid 1970s he had become "the foremost expositor writer of computer science"; he published 19 books.

He was editor of ACM Computing Surveys (ISSN 0360-0300) between 1973 and 1976.

In 1985 he received the ACM Special Interest Group on Computer Science Education Award for Outstanding Contribution to Computer Science Education.

He died of leukemia on December 21, 1985.

He taught at the University of Utah, where a Memorial Lecture series was established in his name.

== Publications ==
- The Multics System: An Examination of its Structure. MIT Press, 1972, ISBN 0-262-15012-3. Still available from the MIT Libraries as a digital reprint (Laser-printed copy or PDF file of a scanned version.)
- Computer Systems Organization: The B5700/B6700. ACM Monograph Series, 1973. LCN: 72-88334
