= Robert S. Barton =

- Born: February 13, 1925; New Britain, Connecticut, U.S.
- Died: January 28, 2009 (aged 83); Portland, Oregon, U.S.
- Education: State University of Iowa
- Known for: Burroughs B5000; Stack machine
- Awards: IEEE W. Wallace McDowell Award; IEEE-ACM Eckert–Mauchly Award (first recipient); IEEE Computer Pioneer Award (charter recipient)
- Scientific career
- Fields: Computer science Mathematics
- Workplaces: University of Utah; Burroughs; Innovations & Inventions
- Doctoral students: Alan Ashton; Alan Davis

Robert Stanley "Bob" Barton (February 13, 1925 – January 28, 2009) was the chief architect of the Burroughs B5000 and other computers such as the B1700, a co-inventor of dataflow architecture, and an influential professor at the University of Utah.

His students at Utah have had a large role in the development of computer science.

Barton designed machines at a more abstract level, not tied to the technology constraints of the time. He employed high-level languages and a stack machine in his design of the B5000 computer. Its design survives in the modern Unisys ClearPath MCP systems. His work with stack machine architectures was the first implementation in a mainframe computer.

Barton died on January 28, 2009, in Portland, Oregon, aged 83.

== Career ==
Barton was born in New Britain, Connecticut in 1925 and received his BA in 1948, and his MS in 1949 in Mathematics, from the University of Iowa. His early experience with computers was when he worked in the IBM Applied Science Department in 1951.

In 1954, he joined the Shell Oil Company Technical Services, working on programming applications. He worked at Shell Development, a research group in Texas where he worked with a Burroughs/Datatron 205 computer. In 1958, he studied Irving Copi and Jan Łukasiewicz's work on symbolic logic and Polish notation, and considered its application to arithmetic expression processing on a computer.

Barton joined Burroughs Corporation, ElectroData Division, in Pasadena, California in the late 1950s. He managed a system programming group in 1959 which developed a compiler named BALGOL for the language ALGOL 58 on the Burroughs 220 computer.

In 1960, he became a consultant for Beckman Instruments working on data collection from satellite systems, for Lockheed Corporation working on satellite systems and organizing of data processing services, and for Burroughs continuing to work on the design concepts of the B5000.

After an assignment in Australia in 1963 for Control Data Corporation, he returned in 1965 to join the Computer Science staff of the Department of Electrical Engineering at the University of Utah where, from 1968 to 1973, his colleagues included David C. Evans, Ivan Sutherland, and Thomas Stockham. His Ph.D. students at the University of Utah were Duane Call, cofounder of Computer System Architects; Alan Ashton, cofounder of WordPerfect; and Al Davis, University of Utah professor of computer science. Other Utah students that he influenced included: Alan Kay, James H. Clark cofounder of Silicon Graphics, John Warnock, cofounder of Adobe Systems, Ed Catmull of Pixar, Henri Gouraud (Gouraud shading) and Bui Tuong Phong (Phong shading).

After 1973, he devoted his full-time to Burroughs Systems Research in La Jolla, San Diego, California, working on new computer architectures and systems programming.

== Awards ==
- IEEE 1977 W. Wallace McDowell Award Recipient. “For his innovative architectural computer concepts, such as stack processing, data stored with self-describing tags, and the direct execution of higher level languages, as embodied in the B-5000 and successor machines”
- Barton was the first recipient of the ACM/IEEE Computer Society Eckert–Mauchly Award in 1979: For his outstanding contributions in basing the design of computing systems on the hierarchical nature of programs and their data.
- Charter Computer Pioneer by the IEEE Computer Society for his work in Language Directed Architecture.

== Selected papers ==
- Barton, Robert S. (January 1961). "Another (Nameless) Compiler for the Burroughs 220". Communications of the ACM. 4 (1): 0.11. doi:10.1145/366062.366070.
- Barton, Robert S. (May 1961). "A New Approach to the Functional Design of a Digital Computer". NJCC Conference Proceedings. 19th Joint Computer Conference, Los Angeles, California, May 9–11, 1961. New York: Association for Computing Machinery. pp. 393–396. doi:10.1145/1460690.1460736.
- Barton, Robert S. (September 1961). "System Description for an Improved Information Processing Machine". ACM Conference Proceedings. 16th Association for Computing Machinery National Conference, Los Angeles, California, September 5–8, 1961. New York: Association for Computing Machinery. pp. 103.101 – 103.104. doi:10.1145/800029.808539.
- Barton, Robert S. (September 1961). "Functional Design of Computers". Communications of the ACM. 4 (9): 405. doi:10.1145/366696.366774. S2CID 47077103.
- Barton, Robert S. (May 1963). "A Critical Review of the State of the Programming Art". AFIPS Conference Proceedings. 23rd Joint Computer Conference, Detroit, Michigan, May 21–23, 1963. New York: Association for Computing Machinery. pp. 169–177. doi:10.1145/1461551.1461574.
- Barton, Robert S. (December 1969). "Ideas for Computer Systems Organization: A Personal Survey". Software Engineering. 3rd Computer and Information Sciences Conference, Miami Beach, Florida, December 18–20, 1969. Vol. 1. New York: Academic Press. pp. 7–16. ISBN 9780323157445.

== Quotes ==
"Systems programmers are the high priests of a low cult." (1967)
