= Rice Institute Computer =

The Rice Institute Computer, also known as the Rice Computer or R1, was a 54-bit tagged architecture digital computer built during 1958–1961 (partially operational beginning in 1959) (Note: (According to a preceding footnote,, the [first] "Rice Computer" became fully operational by some time in 1961.)) on the campus of Rice University, Houston, Texas, United States. Operating as Rice's primary computer until the middle 1960s, the Rice Institute Computer was decommissioned in 1971. The system initially used vacuum tubes and semiconductor diodes for its logic circuits; some later peripherals were built in solid-state emitter-coupled logic. It was designed by Martin H. Graham. A copy of the machine called OSAGE was built and operated at the University of Oklahoma.

== Memory ==
Memory was implemented using a variety of technologies over the lifetime of the R1. Originally a cathode ray tube or "Williams tube" array, RCA core memory was introduced in 1966, followed by Ampex core memory in 1967. Following those two upgrades, the R1 had reached its full 32k word capacity, although the original electrostatic memory was soon decommissioned due to falling reliability in its old age.

== Architecture ==
The R1 had seven memory-mapped general-purpose processor registers, each 54 bits in size, in addition to a constant zero register. For memory addressing, seven 16-bit "B-Registers" were used. The program counter was also held in a writable "B-Register". See the table below for conventions and hardware-enforced usage of these registers.

Address	Abbreviation	Usage
0	0	Constant zero register
1	U	Universal math register
2	R	Remainder
3	S	Storage
4–7	T4–T7	Fast temporary storage

== See also ==
- List of vacuum-tube computers
