= Burroughs Corporation =

American computer company

- Formerly: American Arithmometer Company (1886–1904); Burroughs Adding Machine Company (1904–1953)
- Industry: Business equipment; Adding machines; Mainframe computers
- Founded: 1886; 140 years ago
- Founder: William Seward Burroughs I
- Defunct: 1986; 40 years ago
- Fate: Merged with the Sperry Corporation to form Unisys
- Headquarters: St. Louis, Missouri, U.S.

The Burroughs Corporation was a major American manufacturer of business equipment. The company was founded in 1886 as the American Arithmometer Company by William Seward Burroughs. The company's history paralleled many of the major developments in computing. At its start, it produced mechanical adding machines, and later moved into programmable ledgers and then computers. It was one of the largest producers of mainframe computers in the world, also producing related equipment including typewriters and printers.

In the 1960s, the company introduced a range of mainframe computers that were well regarded for their performance running high-level languages. These formed the core of the company's business into the 1970s. At that time the emergence of superminicomputers and the dominance of the IBM System/360 and 370 at the high end led to shrinking markets, and in 1986 the company purchased former competitor Sperry UNIVAC and merged their operations to form Unisys.

== Early history ==
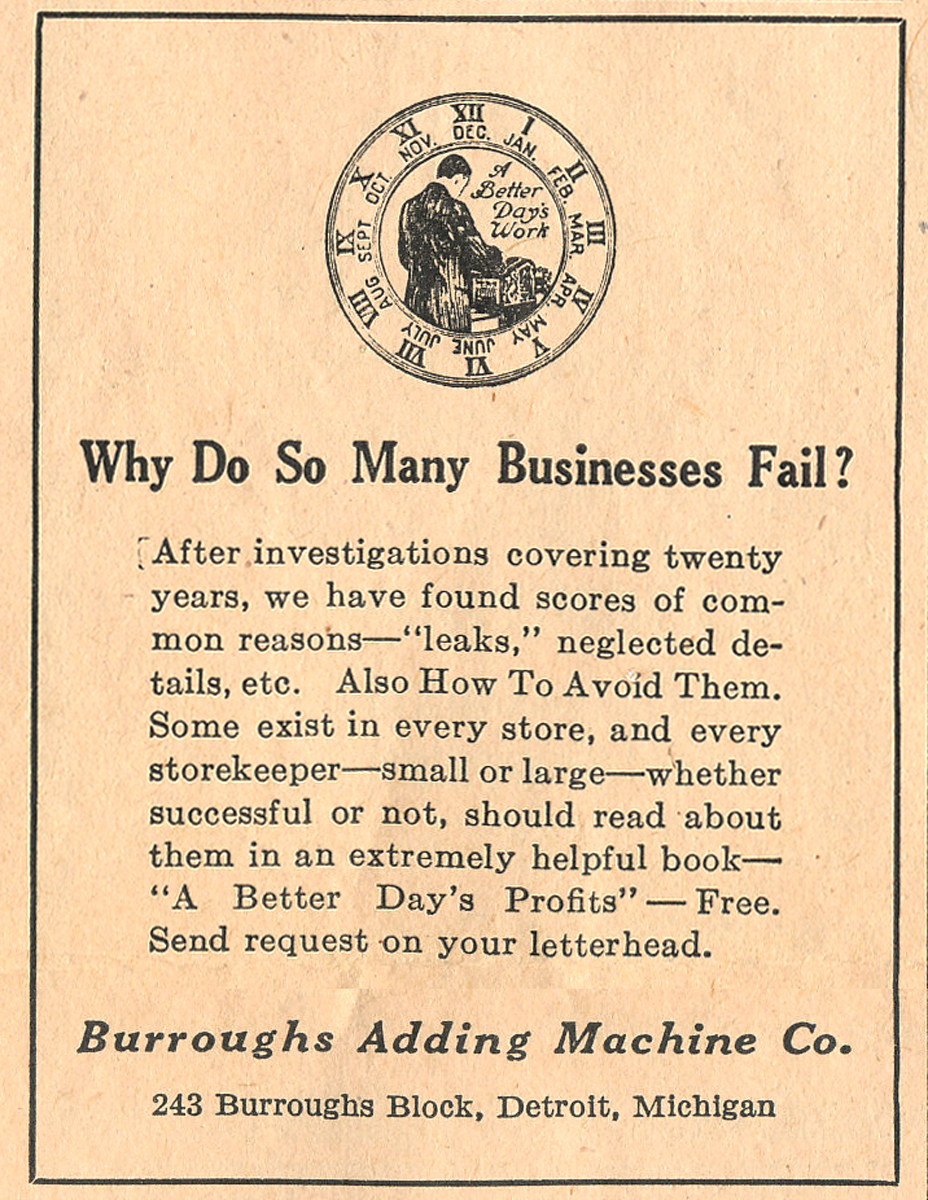
1914 advertisement

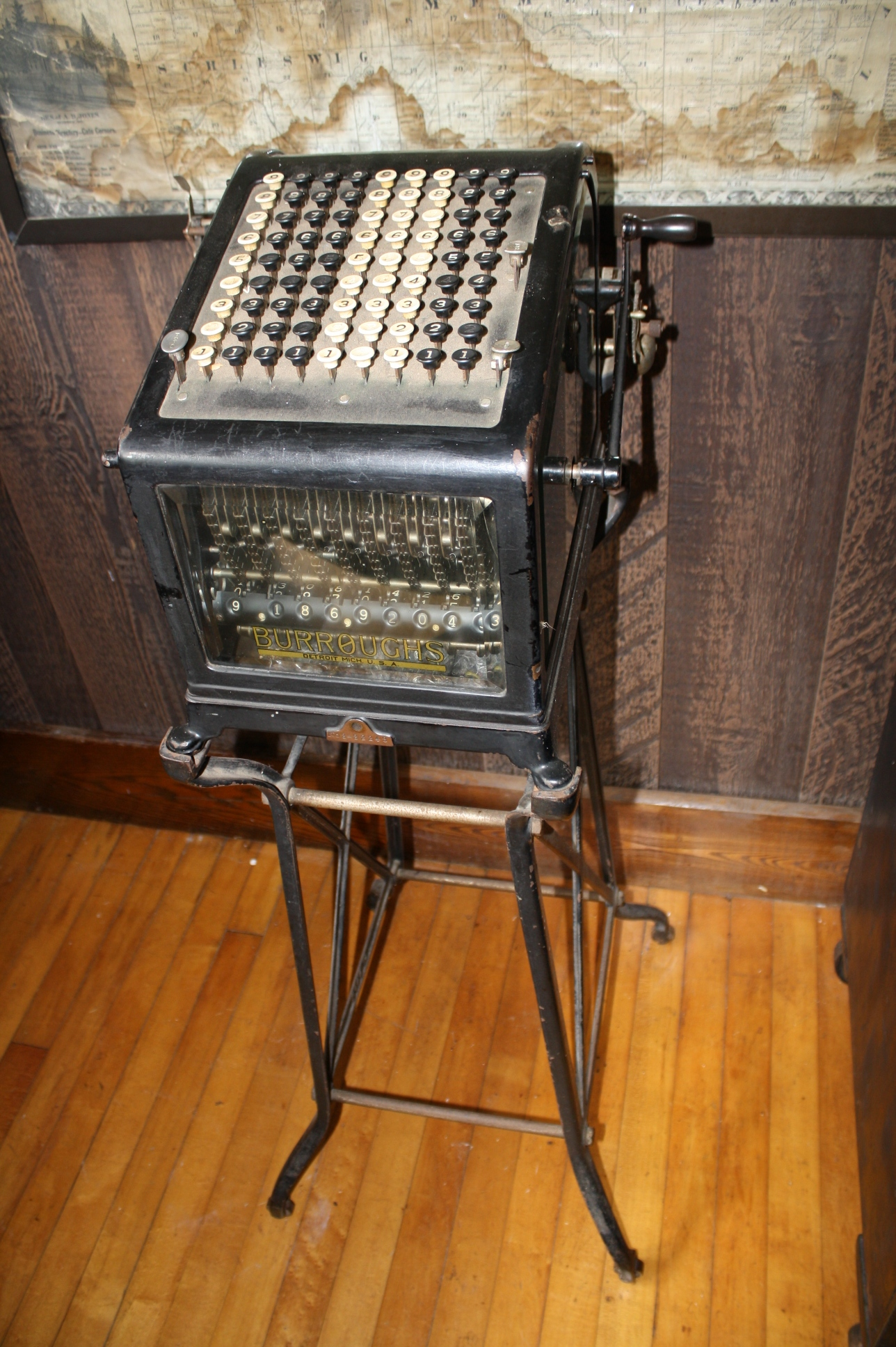
An early Burroughs adding machine

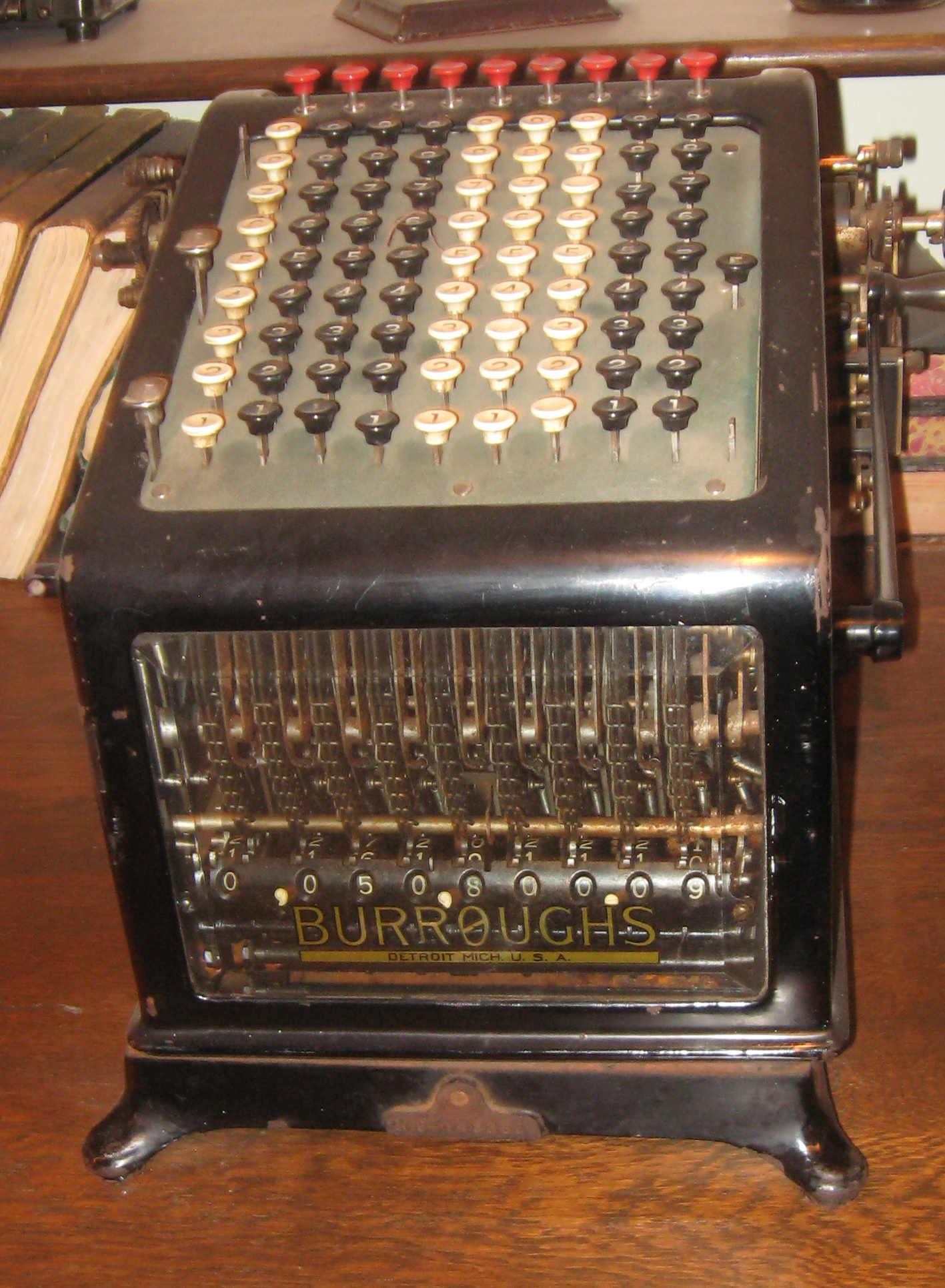
Desktop model in use around 1910

In 1886, the American Arithmometer Company was established in St. Louis, Missouri, to produce and sell an adding machine invented by William Seward Burroughs (grandfather of Beat Generation author William S. Burroughs). In 1904, six years after Burroughs's death, the company moved to Detroit and changed its name to the Burroughs Adding Machine Company. It was soon the biggest adding machine company in America.

== Evolving product lines ==
The adding machine range began with the basic, hand-cranked Class 1 which was only capable of adding. The design included some revolutionary features, foremost of which was the dashpot which governed the speed at which the operating lever could be pulled so allowing the mechanism to operate consistently correctly. The machine also had a full-keyboard with a separate column of keys 1 to 9 for each decade where the keys latch when pressed, with interlocking which prevented more than one key in any decade from being latched. The latching allowed the operator to quickly check that the correct number had been entered before pulling the operating lever. The numbers entered and the final total were printed on a roll of paper at the rear, so there was no danger of the operator writing down the wrong answer and there was a copy of the calculation which could be checked later if necessary.

The Class 2 machine, called the "duplex" and built in the same basic style, provided a means of keeping two separate totals. The Class 6 machine was built for bookkeeping work and provided the ability for direct subtraction.

Burroughs released the Class 3 and Class 4 adding machines which were built after the purchase of the Pike Adding Machine Company around 1910. These machines provided a significant improvement over the older models because operators could view the printing on the paper tape. The machines were called "the visible" for this improvement.

In 1925 Burroughs released a much smaller machine called "the portable". Two models were released, the Class 8 (without subtraction) and the Class 9 with subtraction capability. Later models continued to be released with the P600 and top-of-the-range P612 offered some limited programmability based upon the position of the movable carriage. The range was further extended by the inclusion of the Series J ten-key machines which provided a single finger calculation facility, and the Class 5 (later called Series C) key-driven calculators in both manual and electrical assisted comptometers.

In the late 1960s, the Burroughs sponsored "nixi-tube" provided an electronic display calculator. Burroughs developed a range of adding machines with different capabilities, gradually increasing in their capabilities. A revolutionary adding machine was the Sensimatic, which was able to perform many business functions semi-automatically. It had a moving programmable carriage to maintain ledgers. It could store 9, 18 or 27 balances during the ledger posting operations and worked with a mechanical adder named a Crossfooter. The Sensimatic developed into the Sensitronic which could store balances on a magnetic stripe which was part of the ledger card. This balance was read into the accumulator when the card was inserted into the carriage. The Sensitronic was followed by the E1000, E2000, E3000, E4000, E6000 and the E8000, which were computer systems supporting card reader/punches and a line printer.

Later, Burroughs was selling more than adding machines, including typewriters.

== Move into computers ==
The biggest shift in company history came in 1953: the Burroughs Adding Machine Company was renamed the Burroughs Corporation and began moving into digital computer products, initially for banking institutions. This move began with Burroughs's purchase in June 1956, of the ElectroData Corporation in Pasadena, California, a spinoff of the Consolidated Engineering Corporation which had designed test instruments and had a cooperative relationship with Caltech in Pasadena. ElectroData had built the Datatron 205 and was working on the Datatron 220. The first major computer product that came from this marriage was the B205 tube computer. In 1968 the L and TC series range was produced (e.g. the TC500—Terminal Computer 500) which had a golf ball printer and in the beginning a 1K (64 bit) disk memory. These were popular as branch terminals to the B5500/6500/6700 systems, and sold well in the banking sector, where they were often connected to non-Burroughs mainframes. In conjunction with these products, Burroughs also manufactured an extensive range of cheque processing equipment, normally attached as terminals to a medium systems such as B200/B300 and larger systems such as a B2700 or B1700.

In the 1950s, Burroughs worked with the Federal Reserve Bank on the development and computer processing of magnetic ink character recognition (MICR) especially for the processing of bank cheques. Burroughs made special MICR/OCR sorter/readers which attached to their medium systems line of computers (2700/3700/4700) and B200/B300 systems and this entrenched the company in the computer side of the banking industry.

== A force in the computing industry ==
Burroughs was one of the nine major United States computer companies in the 1960s, with IBM the largest, Honeywell, NCR Corporation, Control Data Corporation (CDC), General Electric (GE), Digital Equipment Corporation (DEC), RCA and Sperry Rand (UNIVAC line). In terms of sales, Burroughs was always a distant second to IBM. In fact, IBM's market share was so much larger than all of the others that this group was often referred to as "IBM and the Seven Dwarves." By 1972 when GE and RCA were no longer in the mainframe business, the remaining five companies behind IBM became known as the BUNCH, an acronym based on their initials.

At the same time, Burroughs was very much a competitor. Like IBM, Burroughs tried to supply a complete line of products for its customers, including Burroughs-designed printers, disk drives, tape drives, computer printing paper and typewriter ribbons.

=== Developments and innovations ===
The Burroughs Corporation developed three highly innovative architectures, based on the design philosophy of "language-directed design". Their machine instruction sets favored one or many high level programming languages, such as ALGOL, COBOL or FORTRAN. All three architectures were considered mainframe class machines:

- The Burroughs Large Systems machines started with the B5000 in 1961. The B5500 came a few years later when large rotating disks replaced drums as the main external memory media. These B5000 Series systems used the world's first virtual memory multi-programming operating system. They were followed by the B6500/B6700 in the later 1960s, the B7700 in the mid-1970s, and the A series in the 1980s. The underlying architecture of these machines is similar and continues today as the Unisys ClearPath MCP line of computers: stack machines designed to be programmed in an extended Algol 60. Their operating systems, called MCP (Master Control Program—the name later borrowed by the screenwriters for Tron), were programmed in ESPOL (Executive Systems Programming Oriented Language, a minor extension of ALGOL) and DCALGOL (Data Communications ALGOL) and later in NEWP (with further extensions to ALGOL) almost a decade before Unix. The command interface developed into a compiled structured language with declarations, statements and procedures called WFL (Work Flow Language).

Architecturally, the machines utilized a tagged architecture with 48-bit words that distinguished program instructions from data, establishing hardware-level memory protection. The systems were also built around a modular multiprocessing design, allowing multiple CPUs, memory modules, and specialized I/O and communications processors to be added incrementally to scale performance and fault tolerance.

In industries like banking, where continuous operations was mandatory, Burroughs Large Systems penetrated nearly every large bank, including the Federal Reserve Bank. Burroughs built the backbone switching systems for Society for Worldwide Interbank Financial Telecommunication (SWIFT) which sent its first message in 1977. Unisys is still the provider to SWIFT today.

- Burroughs produced the B2500 or "medium systems" computers aimed primarily at the business world. The machines were designed to execute COBOL efficiently. This included a BCD (binary-coded decimal) based arithmetic unit, storing and addressing the main memory using base 10 numbering instead of binary. The designation for these systems was Burroughs B2500 through B49xx, followed by Unisys V-Series V340 through V560.
- Burroughs produced the B1700 or "small systems" computers that were designed to be microprogrammed, with each process potentially getting its own virtual machine designed to be the best match to the programming language chosen for the program being run.
- The smallest general-purpose computers were the B700 "microprocessors" which were used both as stand-alone systems and as special-purpose data-communications or disk-subsystem controllers.
- Burroughs manufactured an extensive range of accounting machines including stand-alone systems such as the Sensimatic, L5000 and B80 and dedicated terminals including the TC500 and specialised check processing equipment.
- In 1982, Burroughs began producing personal computers, the B20 and B25 lines with the Intel 8086/8088 family of 16-bit chips as the processor. These ran the BTOS operating system, which Burroughs licensed from Convergent Technologies. These machines implemented an early local area network to share a hard disk between workgroup users. These microcomputers were later manufactured in Kunming, China for use in China under agreement with Burroughs.
- Burroughs collaborated with University of Illinois on a multiprocessor architecture developing the ILLIAC IV computer in the early 1960s. The ILLIAC had up to 128 parallel processors while the B6700 & B7700 only accommodated a total of 7 CPUs and/or I/O units (the 8th unit was the memory tester).
- Burroughs made military computers, such as the D825 (the "D" prefix signifying it was for defense industrial use), in its Great Valley Laboratory in Paoli, Pennsylvania. The D825 was, according to some scholars, the first true multiprocessor computer. Paoli was also home to the Defense and Space Group Marketing Division.
- In 1964 Burroughs had completed the D830 which was another variation of the D825 designed specifically for real-time applications, such as airline reservations. Burroughs designated the B8300 after Trans World Airlines (TWA) ordered one in September 1965. A system with three instruction processors was installed at TWA's reservations center in Rockleigh, New Jersey in 1968. The system, which was called George, with an application programmed in JOVIAL, was intended to support some 4000 terminals, but the system experienced repeated crashes due to a filing system disk allocation error when operating under a large load. A fourth processor was added but did nothing to resolve the problem. The problem was resolved in late 1970 and the system became stable. The decision to cancel the project was being made at the very time that the problem was resolved. TWA cancelled the project and acquired one IBM System/360 Model 75, two IBM System/360 model 65s, and IBM's PARS software for its reservations system. TWA sued Burroughs for non-fulfillment of the contract, but Burroughs counter-sued, stating that the basic system did work and that the problems were in TWA's applications software. The two companies reached an out-of-court settlement.
- Burroughs developed a half-size version of the D825 called the D82, cutting the word size from 48 to 24 bits and simplifying the computer's instruction set. The D82 could have up to 32,768 words of core memory and continued the use of separate instruction and I/O processors. Burroughs sold a D82 to Air Canada to handle reservations for trips originating in Montreal and Quebec. This design was further refined and made much more compact as the D84 machine which was completed in 1965. A D84 processor/memory unit with 4096 words of memory occupied just 1.4 cubic feet (40 litres). This system was used successfully in two military projects: field test systems used to check the electronics of the Air Force General Dynamics F-111 Aardvark fighter plane and systems used to control the countdown and launch of the Army's Pershing 1 and 1a missile systems.

== Merger with Sperry ==
Logo of Burroughs Corporation shortly before its merger with Sperry

In September 1986, Burroughs Corporation merged with Sperry Corporation to form Unisys. For a time, the combined company retained the Burroughs processors as the A- and V-systems lines. As the market for large systems shifted from proprietary architectures to common servers, the company eventually dropped the V-Series line, although customers continued to use V-series systems as of 2010. As of 2017 Unisys continues to develop and market the A-Series, now known as ClearPath.

== Burroughs Payment Systems ==
Burroughs, Inc.

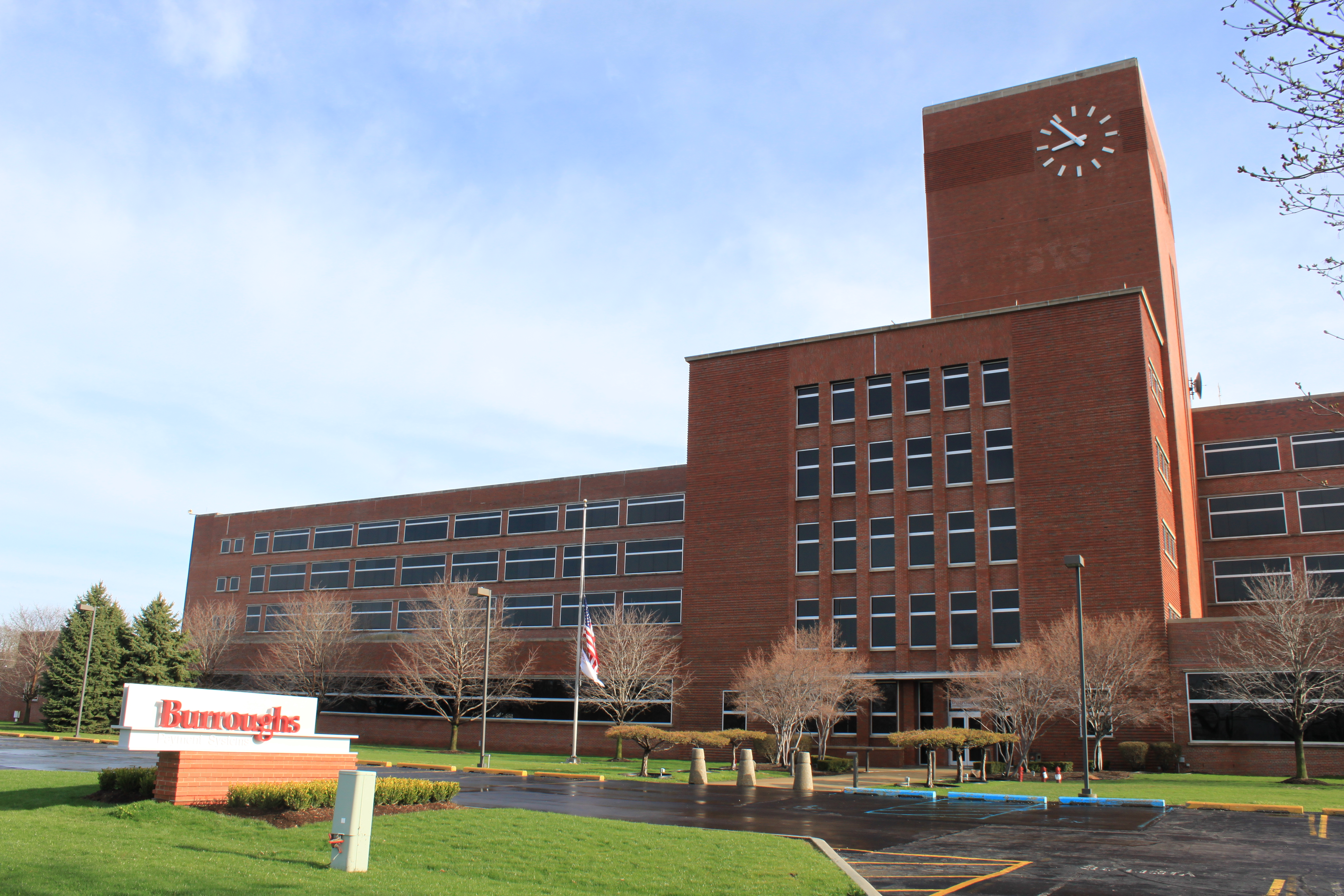
- Burroughs (Payment Systems), Inc., in Plymouth, Michigan, 2011
- Formerly: Burroughs Payment Systems, Inc. (2010–2012)
- Founded: 2010; 16 years ago
- Headquarters: Plymouth, Michigan, United States
- Products: Payment processors
- Parent: Marlin Equity Partners
- Website: burroughs.com

In 2010, Unisys sold off its Payment Systems Division to Marlin Equity Partners, a California-based private investment firm, which incorporated it as Burroughs Payment Systems, Inc. (later just Burroughs, Inc.), based in Plymouth, Michigan.

== References in popular culture ==
Burroughs B205 hardware has appeared as props in many Hollywood television and film productions from the late 1950s. For example, a B205 console was often shown in the television series Batman as the Bat Computer; also as the flight computer in Lost in Space. B205 tape drives were often seen in series such as The Time Tunnel and Voyage to the Bottom of the Sea. Burroughs equipment was also featured in the movie The Angry Red Planet.
