= Information technology industry in New Zealand =

Overview of information technology in New Zealand

The information and communications technology industry in New Zealand is a rapidly growing sector. The technology sector overall employs over 120,000 people, and technology is New Zealand's third largest export sector, accounting for $8.7 billion of exports, with information technology creating 50,000 full time jobs, and about $1 billion in IT services exports.

== History ==
=== Early computing services ===
The first computers in New Zealand were large Mainframe computers, mainly for government departments. The first industry professional body, New Zealand Computer Society was founded in 1960.

The introduction of computers in the commercial sector in New Zealand took off in the 1960s. The Bank of New Zealand was one of the first private-sector users, followed by Griffin's Foods. In 1964, the first local IT services company was Computer Bureau Limited (CBL), the predecessor of Datacom, followed shortly by Computer Services Limited in September 1964, founded by Denis Trotman. These businesses were computer bureaus, sharing computer resources among multiple customers. In 1967, the major commercial banks pooled their resources to form Databank Limited, to digitise banking services in New Zealand. Databank was later acquired by EDS.

=== Growing software exports ===
As New Zealand's computing capabilities expanded, software development became a major feature of the information technology sector. Progeni Software became the first New Zealand company to export software in 1968.

In the early 1970s, Gil Simpson and Peter Hoskins wrote LINC fourth-generation programming language (4GL) which was marketed internationally by Burroughs. They later founded the Aoraki Corporation.

In the 1980s Progeni, working with Wellington Polytechnic, with finance from the Development Finance Corporation, developed the Poly microcomputer, which was exported to Australia and China. In 1988, Peace Software was founded, also a major exporter of New Zealand-developed software.

In 1991 Binary Research was founded, and later sold to Symantec Corporation.

== Entities ==
Today, Datacom Group is New Zealand's largest information technology company and largest technology company, according to the "TIN200" index, followed by Fisher & Paykel, Fisher & Paykel Healthcare, Xero, Gallagher Group, Livestock Improvement Corporation, Douglas Pharmaceuticals, Temperzone Group, Scott Technology, and Weta Digital.

=== IT services and products ===
IT services companies are defined as providing "professional and IT infrastructure services" and include Datacom Group, Intergen, Optimation Group and other major multi-nationals operating in New Zealand such as IBM and Fujitsu.

IT product companies are businesses that provide applications or products that focus on a particular sector and include Xero, Gentrack, Serko, Pushpay and Jade.

== Startup industry ==
New Zealand supports an active startup community with various public and private institutions dedicated to increasing the support and funding available to local entrepreneurs.

=== Government support ===
NZTE and Callaghan are the two primary government organisations charged with supporting the growth of startups in the country, offering access to expertise, export and research grants.

=== VC industry ===
Funding for post-seed companies has traditionally been dominated by local VC firms such as Icehouse Ventures and Movac, who were one of the early founders of the industry, have been actively investing since 1998 and had success with large exits including companies such as Trademe. More recently, Australian VCs have started entering the market and are quickly growing in presence.

=== Other ===
With VCs typically being focused on later-stage companies seeking their Series A or later, an active community of angel investors has emerged that play an important role in funding early-stage technology companies before they are large enough to raise venture capital.

Incubator studios, such as Dovetail, are also becoming increasingly important active investors in the New Zealand startup market and in addition to providing capital, take on an active role in the growth of its portfolio companies.

New Zealand has several startup accelerators, that provide access to networks, expertise and funding. These are often supported by a combination of government and industry and based in Auckland or Wellington.

== See also ==
- Internet in New Zealand
- Institute of IT Professionals
- Telecommunications in New Zealand
- Video games in New Zealand
