= ES7000 =

Unisys server product line

The ES7000 is Unisys's x86/Windows, Linux and Solaris-based server product line. The "ES7000" brand has been used since 1999, although variants and models within the family support various processor and bus architectures. The server is marketed and positioned as a scale-up platform where scale-out becomes inefficient. Typically the ES7000 is utilized as a platform for homogeneous consolidation, large databases (SQL Server and Oracle), Business intelligence, Decision Support Systems, ERP, virtualization, as well as large Linux application hosting.

The hardware and software elements of the server are monitored by a software suite known as Server Sentinel.

== Architecture ==
Elements of the ES7000 architecture includes

- Multiple power domains
- N+1 redundancy for most components
- Subpod CPU scaling (4 cpu increment)
- Centralized memory/cache control
- Shared cache
- Point to point crossbar connections (fleXbar) among memory, processors, and I/O components
- Multiple I/O PCI bridges and buses
- Up to 8 direct I/O bridges each providing 3 independent PCI buses, supporting 96 PCI slots (On 100 and 200 series)
- Multiple memory storage units that can be combined or used separately

== History ==
This server family has undergone several model revisions in its lifetime since 1999. Initially, the servers were standalone: physically the configuration resembled a 19" rack albeit with a somewhat larger footprint (Models 100, 130, 200, 230, 550, 400). Second and third generation ES7000s were rack mountable cells 4U or 3U high that fit in industry-standard racks.

== First generation systems ==
Half the PCI slots on an ES7000/100/200/230/550 system

- ES7000/100 Series - (1999/2000) Support for 32 Xeon processors, 64 GB RAM, 96 PCI slots under Microsoft Windows NT EE and Windows 2000 DC

== Second generation systems ==
- ES7000/200 Series - Support for up to 32 Xeon Processors, 64 GB RAM, 96 PCI slots under Microsoft Windows NT EE and Windows 2000 DC
- ES7000/230 Series - Support for up to 32 Xeon Processors, 64 GB RAM, 96 PCI slots under Windows 2000 DC and Windows 2003 DC
- ES7000/130 Series - Support for up to 32 Itanium processors

== Third generation systems ==
PCI slots on an ES7000/510/520/530/540 system

- ES7000/500 Series (510/420/530/540)
- ES7000/550 Series - Support for up to 32 Xeon processors, 64 GB RAM, 96 PCI Slots under Windows 2000 DC and Windows 2003 DC
- ES7000/400 Series (405/410/420/430/440) - Support for up to 32 Itanium processors and 128 GB RAM under Windows 2000 DC and Windows 2003 DC

== Fourth generation systems ==
- ES7000/600 Series - Support for up to 32 Dual Core Xeon or Itanium processors, 256 GB RAM, 40 PCI Slots under Windows 2003 DC
- ES7000/One Series - Support for up to 32 Dual Core Xeon or Itanium 2 processors, 256 GB RAM, 40 PCI Slots under Windows 2003 DC

== Fifth generation systems ==
- From late 2008, ES7000 7600R ("Kona") scalable from 1 cell of 24 cores to 4 cells of 96 cores of Xeon Hexcore and 1T of memory
- Hexcore and high IO throughput crossbar make Kona twice the performance of previous top-of-the-line ES7000/one on half the cells, at a fraction of the price and 1/3 less rack space
- Built for green, scale-up database, scale-up virtualization (HyperV, VMware) and application consolidation workloads gaining performance and cost savings relative to many smaller, scale-out boxes (administration/maintenance, floorspace, heating, cooling)
- Number 1 TPC-E benchmark

== Form factors ==
The ES7000 models are broken down into three form factors.

- Cabinet/Frame size (A monolithic, midplane architecture, but deeper than a conventional rack)
- 4U Size Cell with up to 8 processors per cell and 8 PCI slots, up to four cells can be bound together to create a 32 cpu system)
- 3U Size Cell with up to 4 processor sockets per cell and 5 PCI slots, up to eight cells can be strapped together to create a 32 socket system)

== Processors ==
The processors used in the ES7000 are:

- Intel Xeon
- Intel Multicore Xeon
- Intel Itanium and Itanium 2
- AMD Opteron

== Operating systems supported ==
ES7000 servers support the Microsoft Windows operating system both 32-bit Xeon and 64-bit Itanium, 32-bit and 64-bit versions of some Linux operating systems, and the Solaris Operating System.

- Windows: 2003 and Windows 2008
- Linux: Novell SUSE Linux Enterprise Server and Red Hat Enterprise Linux
- VMware: ESX 3.02 and ESX 3.5
- Unisys OS 2200
- Unisys MCP
- Solaris
