= Perot Systems =

Information technology company

Perot Systems Corporation
- Type: Public
- Traded as: NYSE: PER
- Industry: Information technology
- Founded: June 1, 1988; 38 years ago
- Founder: Ross Perot
- Defunct: September 21, 2009; 17 years ago
- Successor: Dell Services, NTT Data Services
- Headquarters: Plano, Texas, United States
- Key people: Ross Perot, Jr., chairman James A. Champy, chairman Peter Altabef, chief executive officer Russell Freeman, chief operating officer
- Services: Application development, systems integration, information technology consulting
- Revenue: US$2.8 billion (2010)
- Number of employees: 23,100 (2010)
- Website: perotsystems.com at the Wayback Machine (archived 2008-06-10)

Perot Systems Corporation was an information technology services provider founded in 1988 by a group of investors led by Ross Perot and based in Plano, Texas, United States. Perot Systems provided information technology services in the industries of health care, government, manufacturing, banking, insurance and others. Perot Systems was especially strong in health care industries with services such as digitizing and automating medical records.

A Fortune 1000 corporation with offices in more than 25 countries, Perot Systems employed more than 23,000 people and had an annual revenue of $2.8 billion prior to its acquisition for $3.9 billion in 2009 by Dell, Inc. as Dell Services. Dell Services was then acquired by NTT Data in November 2016.

== History ==
H. Ross Perot and eight associates founded Perot Systems in June 1988 after having sold EDS to General Motors. Before its acquisition by Dell Inc. in September 2009, Perot Systems was a Fortune 1000 corporation with more than 23,000 associates and annual revenue (2008) of $2.8 billion. The company maintained offices in more than 25 countries around the world, including the United States, Europe, India, China, and Mexico.

By 1996 Perot's family owned 40% of Perot Systems, but Perot himself had little daily involvement with it, running for the United States presidency. Executives reportedly were divided on whether Perot's reputation for wealth and business success benefited Perot Systems more than being associated with his political positions, and discussed whether to rename the company.

On September 21, 2009, it was officially announced that Dell and Perot Systems had entered into a definitive agreement for Dell to acquire Perot Systems for approximately $3.9 billion (~$5.68 billion in 2025). The acquisition was designed to provide Dell with access to a wider set of IT services and solutions while providing existing Perot Systems customers with access to Dell computers and other hardware. Under the agreement, Dell acquired all of the company's class A stock for $30 per share, representing a 61% premium over the previous closing price for Perot Systems stock. Dell sold the division to NTT Data in 2016. Non-official sources stated the merger to Dell failed due continued conflicts in culture, and the loss of talent to various clients such as Tenet Hospitals and other start ups by former leaders. Additionally, former Perot/Dell employees founded Guide IT in 2013 (Scott Barnes, Jack Evans, John Furniss, Tim Morris, and Russell Freeman, later to include Chuck Lyles) with backing from Ross Perot Jr.

== Recognition ==
As a top-five finisher for the third consecutive year, Perot Systems was named to the Fortune magazine “Most Admired Companies in America” list for IT Services in 2008. Company ratings are based on eight criteria, ranging from investment value and quality of products/services to innovation and quality of management. According to a survey Dell Services (the successor of Perot Systems) was ranked #1 as an IT provider in the US healthcare market.

== See also ==
- Electronic Data Systems
