= Gil Simpson =

New Zealand businessman (born 1948)

Sir Gilbert Simpson KNZM QSM (born 5 April 1948) is a New Zealand businessman and computer programmer.

== Early life ==
Simpson was born in Christchurch, New Zealand, on 5 April 1948, and raised in the Waikato. He was educated at Christchurch Boys' High School, and in 1967 began his career as a computer programmer, at age 18.

== Career ==
In 1969 he wrote the initial direct debit and direct credit applications which are in common use throughout the New Zealand banking industry today. By age 22 he was Head of Computer Programming at the Comalco aluminium smelter in Bluff, which at that time was the largest industrial project ever undertaken in New Zealand.

He returned to Christchurch around 1972, making it his home permanently. He lived in Jeddah, Saudi Arabia, working as a programmer for Caterpillar Inc. between 1976 and 1978, after which he returned to New Zealand to develop a new concept in computer programming through his creation of the fourth generation language LINC, New Zealand's most successful software export to date. He has resided in Christchurch ever since, where there is now a street named after him Sir Gil Simpson Drive.

Simpson is the founder of the Aoraki Corporation (later known as Jade Software Corporation), developers of the LINC 4GL and Jade programming language, who are also well known for their past sponsorship of Christchurch's Jade Stadium. More recently he founded Jolly Good Software Pty Ltd in 2006.

Simpson is recognised around the world as an advisor and speaker on Information Technology, particularly in the area of e-commerce.

In the 1989 local elections, Simpson stood in the Papanui ward of Christchurch City Council as part of the Christchurch Action ticket formed by Margaret Murray. He came fourth of six candidates in the ward that returned two councillors.

== Honours and awards ==
In the 1986 Queen's Birthday Honours, Simpson was awarded the Queen's Service Medal for public services. In the 2000 New Year Honours, he was appointed a Knight Companion of the New Zealand Order of Merit, for services to information technology, commerce and the community. Later in 2000 Simpson received The New Zealand Computer Society's Supreme Award for the most outstanding contribution to computing in New Zealand in the 20th century. In 2005, he was inducted into the New Zealand Business Hall of Fame, an honour reserved for business leaders responsible for outstanding contributions to the nation. In 2008 Simpson received an NZX Flying Kiwi Award and joined the PricewaterhouseCoopers NZ Hi-Tech Hall of Fame. Simpson has also been a director on the board of the Reserve Bank of New Zealand.

His honours and awards include:

- An honorary doctorate from the University of Canterbury, D.Sc. (h.c.)
- Past presidency of the Royal Society of New Zealand, of which he is now an honorary member
- Chairman of the New Zealand government's E-Commerce Action Team
- Chair of the New Zealand E-Commerce Summit, 2000
- Chairman of the Christchurch City Mission
- Associate membership of the New Zealand Business Roundtable
- Fellow of the New Zealand Institute of Management, and past membership on the NZIM advisory board
- Fellow of the New Zealand Institute of Directors
- Honorary Fellow of the Institute of IT Professionals
- Founding patron of the Royal District Nursing Service, Australia
- Outstanding Contribution to Technology and Business in New Zealand, New Zealand CIO Awards

== Personal life ==
Simpson is married to Joyce Adele, Lady Simpson, known as Joy Simpson. She has been active in community activities and fundraising since the 1970s, and has been described as one of the 50 most powerful people in Christchurch. In the 2016 New Year Honours, Lady Simpson was appointed a Companion of the New Zealand Order of Merit, for services to philanthropy.
