= Datacom Group =

Information technology company in New Zealand

Datacom Group Ltd

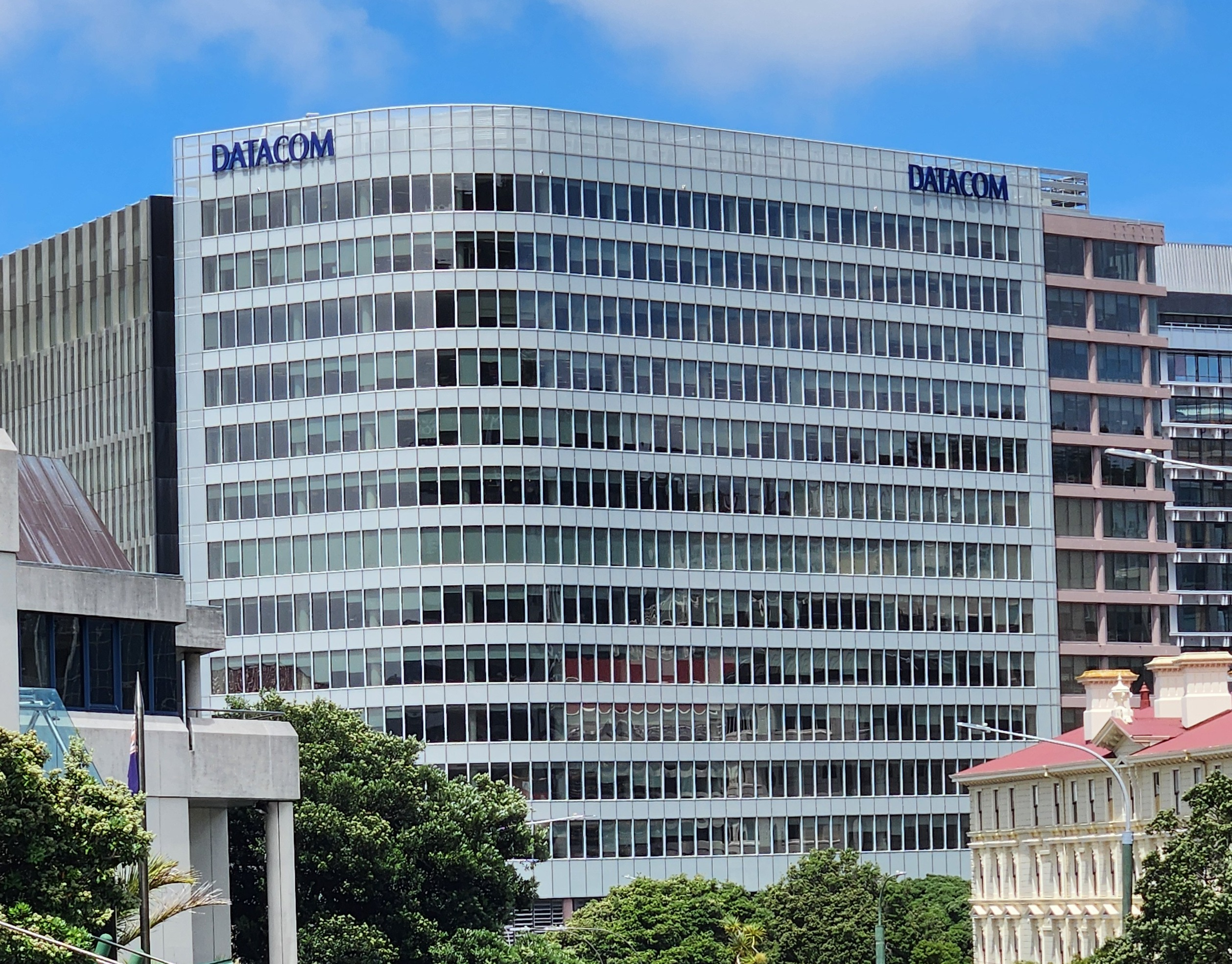
- The Datacom headquarters in Wellington
- Type: Private
- Industry: IT Services: managed services, consulting, cloud services, data centre services, software development, business process management, payroll services, artificial intelligence
- Founded: 1965; 61 years ago
- Founders: Dr Bernard Battersby; Paul Hargreaves
- Headquarters: 55 Featherston St, Wellington, New Zealand
- Key people: Greg Davidson – Group CEO; Tony Carter – Chairman
- Revenue: ▼NZ$1.47 billion (FY24)
- Net income: ▲NZ$41 million (FY24)
- Owners: Evander Management (54.92 per cent) New Zealand Superannuation Fund (44.08 per cent)
- Number of employees: ~ 6000 (2024)
- Website: www.datacom.com

Datacom Group Limited is an Information Technology services company, offering management and consulting, cloud services, ITO, data centre services, custom software development, and payroll services. Datacom is the largest technology company in New Zealand. The company was started in New Zealand in 1965, but has expanded to operate in Australia, Malaysia, the Philippines, the United States and the United Kingdom, employing over 6,500 people across 26 offices globally.

The company's two biggest shareholders are Evander Management Ltd (the family company of John Holdsworth) with 54.92 per cent and the New Zealand Superannuation Fund with 44.08 per cent. The New Zealand Superannuation Fund spent $142 million in 2012 buying out New Zealand Post's 35 per cent shareholding. John Holdsworth stepped down as chairman of the board in 2012 and was replaced by New Zealand businessman Craig Boyce.

Datacom was founded as Computer Bureau Ltd in Christchurch, New Zealand, in 1965. It expanded nationally through the holding company Datacom Group Ltd in 1971, before opening offices in Australia in 1992, and in Asia in 1994. Greg Davidson serves as Group CEO.

== History ==
=== 1960s ===
Datacom was founded as Computer Bureau Ltd in 1965 by two Christchurch accountants, Dr Bernard Battersby and Paul Hargreaves.

A group of clients put up the original capital for the company – £30,000 – and an order was placed for an ICL 1902 computer, which didn't arrive in New Zealand for another year.

The company hired its first systems analysts and programmers in August 1965 and installed the first computer for a client in September of the following year.

In 1968, the company, now called CBL added additional offices in Wellington, Auckland and Hamilton between 1968 and 1970.

=== 1970s ===
In 1970, Hargreaves quit his family's accounting firm to run CBL full-time, and the business expanded to Auckland via the acquisition of the Fletcher Computer Bureau.

In 1971, the Datacom Group holding company was established.

CBL began offering remote on-line services through onsite terminals beginning in 1976.

=== 1980s ===
CBL expanded its software development arm, introducing User-11, the first 4GL (Fourth-generation programming language) seen in New Zealand in 1981. The company also set up a data communications network and a New Zealand-wide timesharing service in the early 1980s initially using DEC PDP 11/70s and then added DEC VAX 11/750s and PDP 11/84s. These systems were also used for Facilities Management customers including the Canterbury Building Society and Hertz Rental Cars.

In 1983, CBL was the first to bring Oracle database technology to New Zealand for the New Zealand Dairy Company (now Fonterra).

In 1984, CBL changed its name to Datacom. Paul Hargreaves was appointed executive director, and later CEO when Battersby retired.

Datacom merged with computer-services company CCL (not to be confused with the Spark subsidiary Computer Concepts Limited) in 1989, added its facilities management and payroll technology to its already established payroll division

=== 1990s ===
In 1991, Datacom signed its first large outsourcing contract in Auckland with Telecom Directories. The same year Datacom Wellington merged with the IT department of New Zealand Post, boosting staff numbers by 90.

In 1992, Datacom established a contact centre in Sydney, and in 1994 its first Australian office. This expanded its NZ-based services to Microsoft Australia. This regional service provided diagnostic technical support services to clients and customers. Datacom began exporting some of its facilities management and IT services into its Australian offices in the late 1990s, leading to the company's first data centre in Australia.

1996 saw the company open its first office in Asia, in Malaysia's Kuala Lumpur.

The business also further established partner programs and sales services with the channel and reseller community.

=== 2000s ===
During the 2000s, Datacom made a series of acquisitions that spread its services to other locations in Australia. In 2004, it purchased GlobalCenter for $7.15 million, its second data centre, and the following year, the company purchased NetOptions to establish a presence in Queensland.

In 2003 Datacom merged with Connect Interactive Business Services to create Datacom Connect, which largely expanded their call centre offerings.

It expanded from this base in 2007 after acquiring IT services company Agire Pty Ltd, located in Townsville.

Through start-up opportunities with local partners, Datacom moved into South Australia in 2006, and Western Australia in 2007. By the end of 2007, the company had acquired a third data centre in Sydney through Hansen Professional Services. Its fourth data centre came in 2011 in Western Australia.

Datacom commenced business in Asia in 1994, building contact centres in Malaysia in 1996, and the Philippines in 2008, at the same time establishing a presence in China.

In 2009 Datacom opened its Auckland data centre, Orbit.

=== 2010s ===
Datacom Technical Security Services is founded by former DSD security expert, Richard Byfield.

In 2010, Datacom opened a sister facility to Orbit, Gloucester, in Christchurch. It opened one week before the 2010 Christchurch Earthquake.

Datacom opened a sister facility to Orbit and Gloucester, Kapua, in Hamilton in 2013.

In 2013 Datacom also sold the contact centre arm of its Asia business, but continued to serve the market with IT services.

In the same year Datacom acquired a SAP payroll firm in Melbourne to establish a strong relationship in the Australian health sector, and as a provider of SAP services.

Datacom purchases WA-based IT services provider, XciteLogic, after it collapses.

In 2014, Datacom announced its acquisition of Tauranga-based software company Origen Technology Ltd.

August 2014 – Datacom co-founder, Paul Hargreaves, died after a short illness.

18 September 2014, Datacom acquired a 20% stake in health informatics company, Smartward

The company also produced the (then) world's largest SAP migration to the Microsoft Azure cloud platform, with the world's largest kiwifruit exporter, Zespri. For its work, Datacom was awarded Microsoft's Cloud Enterprise Award at the 2013 Microsoft NZ Partner Awards.

In March 2015, Datacom won the Australian Federal Department of Health support services contract after a competitive tender process. The $242 million, five-year deal will see Datacom providing technology infrastructure and support services under a fully managed, consumption-based model. This joined its other Australian long term government contracts, such as Australian Customs, Australian Border Force and CrimTrac, the Department of the Environment, the Australian Taxation Office, and Airservices Australia.

In July 2015, Datacom was announced as Australia's first company to join Amazon Web Services Managed Service Program, one of only 20 worldwide.

In November 2015, Microsoft Australia announced Datacom as one of the latest partners to join its one-tier Cloud Solution Provider (CSP) program, which allows them to own the billing for products such as Office 365.

Datacom opened its third office in Melbourne in April 2016, bring 100 new jobs to the region.

In August 2016, Datacom launched its Augmented Reality practice, the ANZ region's first, focused around Microsoft's Hololens.

In September 2016, Datacom was selected to deliver the Western Australian State Government's $1bn GovNext-ICT programme. This will encapsulate a blend of data centre, server, cloud services, storage and telephone services across all state government departments.

In December 2016, Datacom won a contract to supply IT infrastructure and support services to Toyota Australia, delivering end-to-end services following a competitive tender process.

In March 2017, Datacom New Zealand consolidated its five existing Auckland offices into a single location in Auckland's Wynyard Innovation Quarter.

Datacom completed Australia's first migration of SAP HANA into AWS, by taking $800 million-turnover resources company Oz Minerals into the cloud in early 2017.

Datacom Chairman, Craig Boyce, announced in November 2017, that Greg Davidson, then Datacom Systems ANZ CEO, would succeed Jonathan Ladd, as Group CEO. Ladd became the Chairman of the International Business, and Greg Davidson formally took over the Group CEO role on 31 March 2018, alongside a new leadership team and organisational structure.

The Datacom Foundation was established in 2019 to provide long-term support for the children of families affected by the Christchurch Mosque Shootings and help them build a brighter future through education.

=== 2020s ===
In July 2022, Datacom secured a four-year contract with Transport for NSW to provide network operations and a high-speed digital ecosystem to support customer service.

In 2023, Datacom moved it corporate headquarters from the building formerly known as Datacom House on Jervois Quay in Wellington to the Asteron Life Building at 55 Featherston St in Wellington.

== Financial results ==
At the conclusion of the 2023/2024 NZ Financial Year (FY24), Datacom reported revenue of NZ$1.47bn, down from $1.49 billion in the prior year (FY23). Net profit before tax was NZ$41m, up from NZ$8m the previous year. Full-year operating cash flow remains strong at $139 million, and the business continues to perform with low debt levels.
