= Peter Altabef =

American businessman and lawyer

- Born: 1959 (age 66–67); New York City, U.S
- Education: University of Chicago
- Occupation: Businessman • Lawyer
- Spouse: Jennifer Altabef
- Children: 2

Peter Altabef (born 1959) is an American businessman and lawyer. He is currently the Chair and former CEO of Unisys, positions he has held since 2018 and 2015, respectively. He also served twice as the company’s president.

Previously, he was president and CEO at MICROS Systems (now owned by Oracle); president of Dell’s services business; and president and CEO of Perot Systems.

== Early life and education ==
Born in New York, Altabef received his bachelor's in economics from Binghamton University in 1980, and a degree in law from the University of Chicago.

== Career ==
Altabef began his career working as a lawyer. From 1985 to 1993, he worked at Hughes & Luce LLP, where he developed connections to the former CEOs of Perot Systems. In 1993, Peter Altabef was hired on at Perot Systems, and became the president and CEO a decade later, in 2004. In 2009, the company was acquired by Dell Services, a business unit of Dell. Altabef remained president and CEO of the company under Dell's ownership, and stepped down in 2011 upon the full integration of new management.

In 2013, Altabef became the president and CEO of MICROS Systems. He remained with the company through its acquisition by Oracle Corporation, and stepped down in 2014. At the end of that year, he was named the incoming president and CEO of Unisys, effective as of January 2015.

In December 2016, he was appointed to serve on the President’s National Security Telecommunications Advisory Committee (NSTAC).

At the end of 2017, Altabef was elected as the Chairman of the Board of Directors of Unisys.

In 2018, he co-led the NSTAC’s Cybersecurity Moonshot initiative. This committee was tasked with developing a “whole-of-nation” cybersecurity plan for the U.S. with the goal of making the internet safe and secure for the delivery of government and critical infrastructure services by 2028. In 2019, he received the Federal Computer Week Industry Eagle award for his work.

Altabef is on the board of directors of NiSource Inc. and Petrus Trust Company, L.T.A.. He is on the board of advisors of Merit Energy Company, LLC, and is a trustee for the Committee for Economic Development, where he is a co-chair of the Technology and Innovation Committee. He previously served on the board of the EastWest Institute, and was a member of the Bretton Woods Committee, the Americas International Advisory Council of the International Business Leaders Forum, and the advisory board of the Institute for Law and Technology of the Center for American and International Law. He was on the associates’ board of Children’s Medical Center Dallas, the advisory board of Dallas Children’s Theater, the Technology Committee of the Highland Park Independent School Board and the Dallas Museum of Natural History. He was co-chairman of the American Heart Association Heart Walk Dallas.

== Personal life ==
Peter Altabef is married to Jennifer Altabef, who is a partner in a Dallas law firm, and they have two children. In November 2021, Peter and Jennifer received the J. Chrys Dougherty Good Apple Award from Texas Appleseed, a nonprofit organization.
