= New Zealand Superannuation Fund =

Sovereign wealth fund of New Zealand

- Type: State-owned
- Industry: Institutional investment (sovereign wealth fund)
- Founded: 2001; 25 years ago
- Founder: Michael Cullen
- Headquarters: Auckland, New Zealand
- Key people: Nicola Willis - Minister of Finance; John Williamson - Chair of the Board; Jo Townsend - Chief Executive Officer; Stephen Gilmore - Chief Investment Officer
- Operating income: ▲NZ$11.2 billion (year to June 2024)
- Total assets: ▲NZ$95.5 billion (June 2026)
- Owner: Government of New Zealand
- Parent: Guardians of New Zealand Superannuation
- Website: www.nzsuperfund.nz

The New Zealand Superannuation Fund (Māori: Te Kaitiaki Tahua Penihana Kaumātua o Aotearoa) is a sovereign wealth fund of New Zealand. The country provides universal superannuation to people over 65 years of age and the purpose of the fund is to partially pre-fund the future cost of the New Zealand Superannuation pension, which is expected to increase as a result of New Zealand's ageing population. The Government is expected to begin withdrawing money from the fund in around 2035/36. The fund is a member of the International Forum of Sovereign Wealth Funds and is therefore signed up to the Santiago Principles on best practice in managing sovereign wealth funds.

In 2019, the New Zealand Superannuation Fund was ranked second out of 64 sovereign wealth funds, with a score of 94 out of 100, in the Sovereign Wealth Fund Transparency and Accountability Scoreboard published by the Peterson Institute for International Economics.

== History ==
The Superannuation Fund was created by the New Zealand Superannuation and Retirement Act 2001 on 11 October 2001 by Michael Cullen, the minister of finance in the Fifth Labour Government. It is colloquially known as the "Cullen Fund".

The sovereign fund posted a record 25.8% return in the twelve months to 30 June 2013. In the 2009 New Zealand budget the National Government suspended payments to the fund. Contributions were proposed to resume in 2020/21 when the Government's net debt to GDP was forecast to fall below 20% again. Instead, the new Labour-led government started payments into the superfund again in December 2017. The New Zealand Government had contributed $21.8 billion to the fund as at 31 March 2022.

NZ Super Fund announced a preferred partner agreement with the Māori Investment Fund in March 2018.

In 2023, Matt Whineray stepped down from his position as chief executive after holding the position since 2018. He was replaced by Jo Townsend.

In September 2024, the fund reported an income of $11.2 billion for the financial year, an increase of almost 15% compared to the previous year. The total value of the fund reached $76.6 billion.

== Investments ==
=== LanzaTech ===
The fund invested US$60 million into Chicago based LanzaTech in December 2014. On 8 March 2022, LanzaTech announced its initial public offering through a special-purpose acquisition company in a deal that valued the company at $2.2 billion.

=== View | Dynamic Glass ===
During August 2015, the New Zealand Superannuation Fund invested US$75 million into American-based electrochromic glass company View with a percentage owned not being released.

=== Kaingaroa Timberlands Partnership ===
On 28 February 2014, the fund sold 2.5% of Kaingaroa Timberlands Partnership to the Kakano Investment Limited Partnership, reducing its share from 41.25% to a 38.75% stake in the Kaingaroa partnership.

=== Other Investments ===
Other investments include a 7,943,351 share (0.71%) stake in partially state-owned and controlled (51.95% - state-owned portion) company Air New Zealand. The Super Fund also holds a 37.59% stake in Datacom Group. The Fund occasionally cooperates with outside companies to develop projects.

=== Exclusions ===
The Superfund maintains a list of excluded companies similar to the Government Pension Fund of Norway. The Superfund will not invest in the companies within the list.

The list includes:

- Companies in the tobacco industry
- Companies involved in the production of nuclear weapons, cluster munitions and anti-personnel mines
- Companies involved in the Grasberg mine in West Papua
- Companies involved in the processing of whale meat
- Tokyo Electric Power Company
- Companies involved in developing settlements in the Israeli-occupied territories
- Companies involved in the manufacture of civilian automatic and semi-automatic firearms

== Controversies ==
=== Banco Espírito Santo ===
In February 2015 the Superfund wrote off a $150 million loss in a Goldman Sachs organised loan to the Portuguese Banco Espírito Santo. The loss represented 0.7% of the total value of the Superfund's investment portfolio at that time. Managers of the Superfund appeared before Parliament's commerce select committee on 26 February 2015 where they confirmed that legal action had been commenced against the Bank of Portugal to recover the lost money.

=== Divestment ===
The Superfund's investment portfolio is the subject of ongoing debate. Labour Party MP David Shearer called in August 2014 for divestment from a company manufacturing white phosphorus which is used by the Israeli Defence Force as a weapon.

In February 2015 Green Party MP Russel Norman called for the Superfund to divest $676 million from fossil fuel companies.

In August 2017 the Superfund quit or reduced holdings in 300 fossil fuel companies, making 40% of all Superfund investments carbon neutral. Companies include: ExxonMobil, Anadarko, Shell, BP, Statoil, New Zealand Oil & Gas, Genesis Energy, Alliant Energy, Berkshire Hathaway, Chevron, Rio Tinto, ConocoPhillips, Mitsubishi and Occidental Petroleum. Chief investment officer Matt Whineray stated, "We think that climate change represents a material risk, one that is not being properly priced by the markets."

Fossil fuel divestment campaign organisation 350.org Aotearoa had been campaigning for the New Zealand Superfund to divest from fossil fuels for one year. 350 Aotearoa and Greenpeace Aotearoa New Zealand supported the decision, calling it a "turning point for New Zealand."

In March 2021, the Guardians of New Zealand Superannuation excluded five Israeli banks from investing in the NZ Super Fund due to their suspected involvement in illegal settlement construction in the West Bank. The five affected banks were the First International Bank of Israel, the Israel Discount Bank, Bank Hapoalim, Bank Leumi and Bank Mizrahi-Tefahot.

On 16 April 2026, High Court Justice Simon Mount found that the Super Fund had failed to adequately address human rights issues when investing in companies operating in the Occupied Palestinian Territories. Mount's decision would require the Guardians of New Zealand Superannuation to rewrite policy documents, standards, procedures and investment policies regarding where New Zealand pensions funds are invested, particularly in companies accused of contributing to human rights abuses. Companies that were covered by Mount's judgement included Airbnb, Booking.com, Motorola and Expedia, which have invested in rental homes, surveillance and transport infrastructure in the Occupied Territories. Mount had ruled in favour of the activist group Palestine Solidarity Network Aotearoa's (PSNA) judicial review of the Super Fund's investment policies. He also ordered the Guardians to pay the PSNA's legal fees.
