= Unisys =

American global information technology company

Unisys Corporation

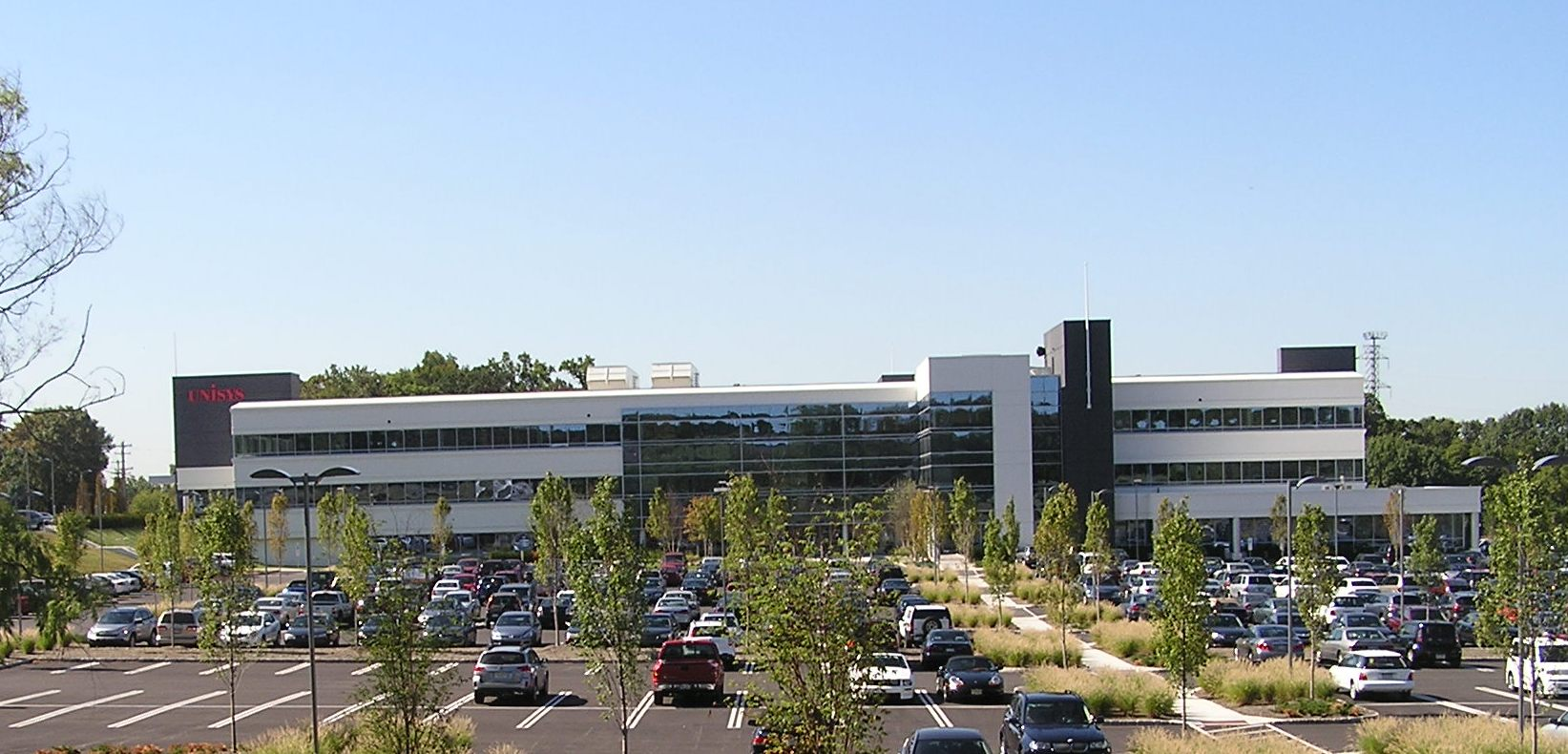
- Unisys' headquarters in Blue Bell, Pennsylvania
- Type: Public
- Traded as: NYSE: UIS; Russell 2000 component
- Industry: Information technology Consulting; Outsourcing
- Predecessor: Burroughs Corporation; Sperry Corporation
- Founded: 1986; 40 years ago
- Headquarters: Blue Bell, Pennsylvania, U.S.
- Area served: Worldwide
- Key people: Michael M. Thomson (CEO); Peter Altabef (Chairman of the Board)
- Services: System integration Cloud infrastructure Cybersecurity; Enterprise computing Business process management Artificial intelligence Data analytics
- Revenue: ▼$2.008 billion (2024)
- Operating income: ▲$97.4 million (2024)
- Net income: ▼$193.4 million (2024)
- Total assets: ▼$1.87 billion (2024)
- Total equity: ▲ ($269.3 million) (2024)
- Number of employees: 16,300 (2021)
- Website: www.unisys.com

Unisys Corporation is an American technology company founded in 1986 and headquartered in Blue Bell, Pennsylvania. The company provides cloud, AI, digital workplace, logistics, and enterprise computing services.

== History ==
=== Founding ===
The company's logo, used from 1986 to 2022

Unisys' history dates back to 1873 with E. Remington & Sons and the introduction of the first commercially viable typewriter to use the QWERTY keyboard layout. Over a hundred years later, the company became known as Unisys in 1986 through the merger of mainframe corporations Sperry and Burroughs, with Burroughs buying Sperry for $4.8 billion.

The new company's name was chosen from over 31,000 submissions in an internal competition when Christian Machen submitted the word "Unisys", which was composed of parts of the words "united", "information", and "systems".

The merger was the largest in the computer industry at the time and made Unisys the second-largest computer company with annual revenue of $10.5 billion. W. Michael Blumenthal became CEO and Chairman.

=== 20th century ===
Soon after the merger, the market for proprietary mainframe-class systems, the mainstream product of Unisys and its competitors such as IBM, saw a decline that continues, at a slower rate, today. Unisys responded by making the strategic decision to shift into high-end servers, including 32-bit processor Windows Servers and information technology (IT) services, such as systems integration, outsourcing, and related technical services, while holding onto the profitable revenue stream from maintaining its installed base of proprietary mainframe hardware and applications.

In 1988, the company acquired Convergent Technologies, creators of Convergent Technologies Operating System (CTOS).

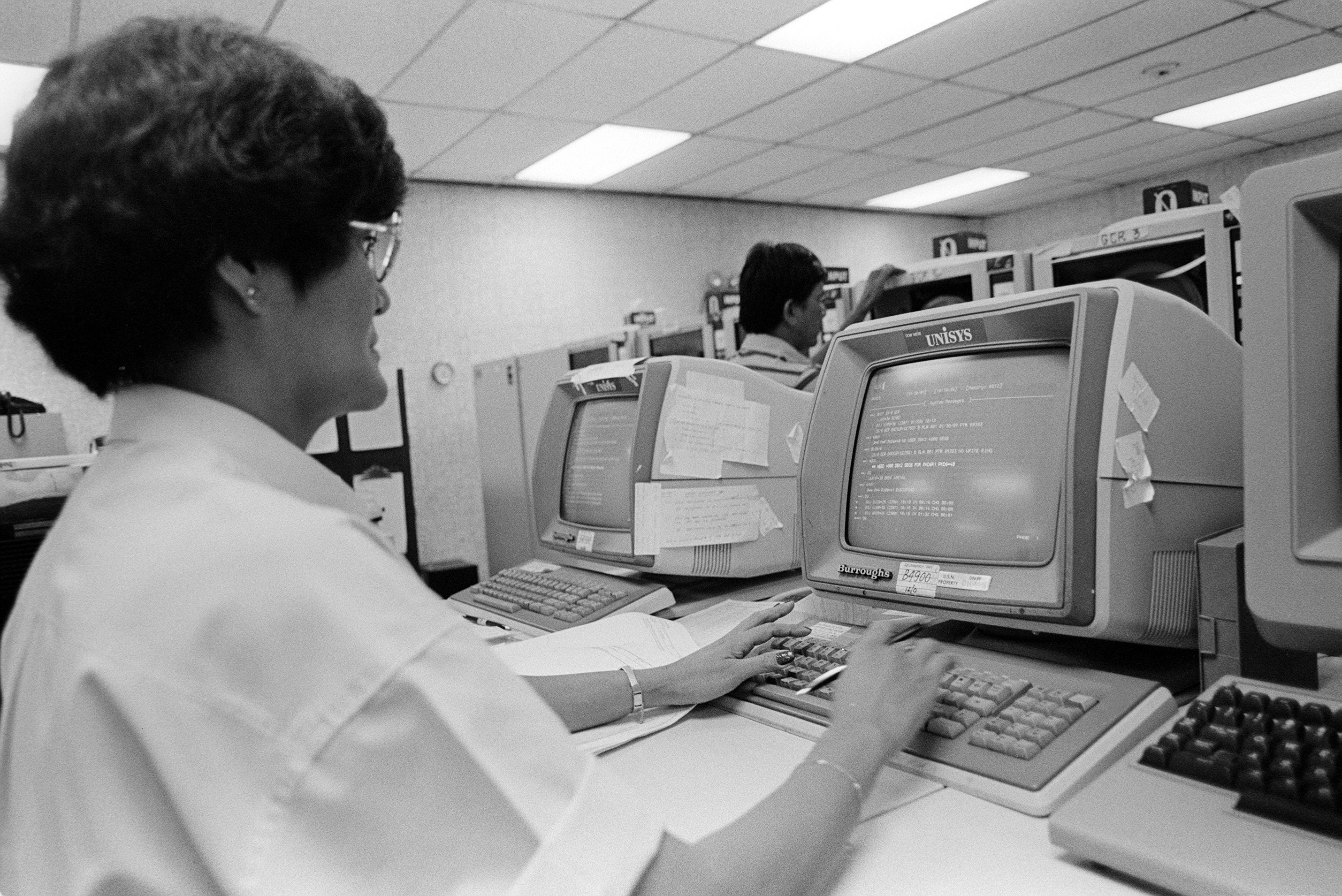
A person doing data entry on a Unisys system in 1989

In 1990, Blumenthal resigned. James Unruh, formerly of Memorex and Honeywell, became the new CEO and Chairman after Blumenthal's departure and continued in both roles until 1997, when Larry Weinbach of Arthur Andersen became the new CEO.

=== 21st century ===
Unisys launched their business process consulting service in 2004. This service called Business Blueprints helped developers create high level models of their own software.

Joseph McGrath served as CEO and President from January 2005, until September, 2008. On October 7, 2008, J. Edward Coleman replaced McGrath as CEO and Chairman.

On November 10, 2008, the company was removed from the S&P 500 index when the market capitalization of the company had fallen below the S&P 500 minimum of $4 billion.

In 2010, Unisys sold its Medicare processing Health Information Management service to Molina Healthcare for $135 million.

On October 6, 2014, after six years as CEO and chairman, Unisys announced that Coleman was stepping down effective December 1, 2014.

In December 2014, Unisys named Peter Altabef as its new president and CEO, replacing J. Edward Coleman. The company also announced that Paul Weaver, who was serving as the interim board chairman, would assume that position on a permanent basis as of January 1, 2015.

In February 2020, SAIC announced plans to acquire Unisys Federal, the company’s federal defense contracting operation, for $1.2 billion. The company’s federal customer list included over a dozen military and civilian agencies. As part of the acquisition, Unisys has a licensing agreement with SAIC to continue providing its software to federal clients.

In June 2020, Australia’s Home Affairs’ biometric identification system, built in part through partnership with Unisys, was launched.

Unisys made several acquisitions in 2021. In June, the company announced the acquisition of Unify Square, which provides software and services which help enterprises manage collaboration and communication platforms like Zoom and Microsoft Teams. In November, Mobinergy, a mobile device management software company, was acquired; and in December, Unisys acquired CompuGain, an Amazon Web Services Advanced Consulting Partner.

In July 2021, Unisys partnered with Vodafone to help the company boost its IT services. The two launched “Vodafone Digital Factory,” and Unisys helped Vodafone clients with technologies like AI, virtual, and augmented reality, and blockchain.

In May 2022, the company joined the Plug and Play Enterprise Tech program. This allowed Unisys to source and partner with technology startups to access and use early-stage emerging technology.

On April 1, 2025, Michael M. Thomson, the company’s president and COO, assumed the position of CEO.

== Recognition and awards ==
=== NelsonHall ===
- In 2018, 2019, 2020, and 2023, Unisys was named a leader in the NelsonHall Evaluation & Assessment Tool (NEAT) Vendor Evaluation for Advanced Digital Workplace Services.
- In 2021 and 2023, Unisys was named a Leader in Cognitive and Self-Healing IT Infrastructure Services in NelsonHall's NEAT Assessment.
- In 2022 and 2024, Unisys was named a Leader in End-to-End Cloud Infrastructure Services in NelsonHall’s NEAT Assessment.
- In 2021 and 2024, Unisys was named a leader in the NEAT Cyber Resiliency Vendor Evaluation.

=== Avasant ===
- In 2021 and 2023, Unisys was recognized as an Innovator and a Leader, respectively, in Avasant’s RadarView for Digital Workplace Services
- In the 2023 and 2024-2025 reports, Unisys was named a Leader in Avasant’s End-User Computing Services RadarView.
- In 2024, Unisys was recognized as a Disruptor in Avasant’s Freight and Logistics Digital Services RadarView Report.
- In 2024, Unisys was recognized as an Innovator in Avasant’s Data Center Managed Services RadarView, Application Modernization Services RadarView, Multisourcing Service Integration RadarView, and the Hybrid Enterprise Cloud Services RadarView.

=== Information Services Group (ISG) ===
- In 2024, Unisys was named a global leader in ISG’s Advanced Analytics and AI Services Provider Lens.
- In 2024, Unisys was recognized as a leader in the ISG Provider Lens Microsoft Cloud Ecosystem Quadrant Report.
- In 2024, Unisys was recognized as a leader in ISG’s Private/Hybrid Cloud Data Center Services Provider Lens, Multi Public Cloud Services Provider Lens, Cybersecurity Solutions and Services Provider Lens, and as a Paragon Awards Winner for transformation.
- In 2023, Unisys was recognized as a Leader in the ISG Provider Lens™ Future of Work - Services and Solutions Quadrant Reports.
- In 2023, Unisys was named a leader in ISG Provider Lens – Private/Hybrid Cloud Data Center Services, Multi Public Cloud Services, and Cybersecurity Solutions and Services.
- In 2021, Unisys was recognized as a global leader in ISG’s Provider Lens report for its cloud and infrastructure services.

=== Everest Group ===
- In 2022, Unisys was recognized as a Major Contender in Cloud Services for North America and Europe in Everest Group’s PEAK Matrix
- In 2024, the company was recognized as a leader in Everest Group’s PEAK Matrix: Digital Workplace Services for midmarket enterprises.

=== IDC ===
- In 2023, Unisys was named a Leader in the IDC MarketScape: European Human-First Digital Workplace Vendor Assessment.
- In 2023, Unisys was named in IDC’s, Worldwide Application Modernization Services MarketScape, Worldwide Managed Public Cloud Services MarketScape, and the Cloud Professional Services WW Higher Education.
- In 2024, Unisys was named in IDC’s Cloud Professional Services North America State & Local Government MarketScape.

=== Forbes ===
- In 2025, Unisys was named a Forbes’ America’s Best Employers for Engineers.
- In 2023, Unisys was named a Forbes’ Best Employers for Women, Best Employers for Diversity, and one of America’s Best Midsize Employers.
- In 2022, Unisys was named a Forbes’ Best Workplaces for Women.

== Products and services ==
Unisys offers a range of IT services, including:

- Outsourced managed services
- Systems integration and consulting services
- Application management and device management software
- High end server technology
- Maintenance and support services
- Cybersecurity services
- Digital workplace services (DWS)
- Cloud and infrastructure services
- Enterprise computing services
- Business process services
- Field services and support

Unisys operates data centers around the world to support its service offerings.

=== Digital Workplace Services (DWS) ===
Digital workplace services deliver technologies focused on improving employee experience, collaboration, productivity, and end-to-end IT support. Unisys’ DWS capabilities include:

- Digital transformation consulting
- Workplace as a Service (WaaS)
- Intelligent workplace services
- Unified experience management
- Modern device management
- Seamless Collaboration

In 2021, Unisys acquired Unify Square - a company that helped others manage collaboration and communications platforms - and Mobinenergy - a unified endpoint management expert. These companies now operate as part of Unisys’ Digital Workplace Services business unit.

=== Cloud, Applications, and Infrastructure (CA & I) ===
Unisys’ CA&I segment provides: applications, cloud, cloud AI, cybersecurity, and data.

In 2020, California State University used Unisys’ CloudForte and Managed Security Services to integrate its hybrid-cloud environment.

After acquiring the company CompuGain, Unisys furthered its cloud capabilities, including hybrid cloud and cloud optimization, agile cloud migration, cloud-native capabilities, and data governance.

=== Cybersecurity ===
In November 2020, Unisys updated its Stealth platform to include visualization and dashboard tools to make it easier for an organization to track security in real-time. The new version made it possible for cybersecurity teams to see relationships between all network endpoints, including multiple clouds and edge computing platforms.

=== Enterprise Computing (ECS) ===
Enterprise computing refers to information technology tools used to implement, configure, maintain, and operate enterprise systems.

Unisys’ ECS offerings include:

- ClearPath: Provides secure, high-performance processing for business operations, optimizing mainframes, modernizing applications, and enabling cloud transitions
- License and support solutions
- Specialized services and next-generation computing
- Micro-market and business process solutions
- Financial services
- Travel and transportation

Unisys was the first to develop a server architecture that supported four operating environments to run simultaneously on the same computer system in a single virtualized partition.

In 2013, Unisys won a $650 million Enterprise Computing Center Support contract to support the computer systems used by the Internal Revenue Service.

== Partnerships ==
Unisys’ partnerships include:

- VMware
- Oracle
- Dell Technologies
- Amazon Web Services (AWS)
- Microsoft
- ServiceNow
- Google
- Lenovo

== Projects ==
Some of Unisys’ projects include:

=== Consumerization of IT ===
A Unisys-sponsored study conducted by IDC revealed a gap between the activities and the expectations of the new “iWorker” generation and organizations’ ability to support their needs. Results indicated that organizations still rely on outdated, standardized IT models, preventing them from benefitting from newer networked technologies.

=== Unisys Innovation Program (UIP) ===
Unisys Innovation Program is a contest for engineering students in India to develop career-ready skills by solving real-world problems with current technologies. It is open to all engineering students in computer science, information technology, and related fields. Students have the opportunity to be mentored by tech industry professionals in various fields. As of 2021, more than 55,000 students have participated. UIP was established in 2009 under the name Cloud 20/20.

== People and culture ==
Unisys was named to Newsweek’s Top 100 Global Most Loved Workplaces list 2024; America’s Most Loved Workplaces list 2024; the 2023 Forbes America’s Best Employers for Diversity list; the Fair360 Noteworthy Companies list; the 2023 and 2022 Forbes America’s Best Employers for Women list; and is a multi-year DivHERsity award winner.

Unisys earned a top score on the Disability Equality Index for five consecutive years (2020-2024). The company was recognized as a “Best Place to Work for Disability Inclusion.” The Disability Equality Index is a joint initiative of Disability:IN and the American Association of People with Disabilities. It is a “comprehensive benchmarking tool to measure disability workplace inclusion.”

In November 2021, Unisys launched its UGrow program to help its employees grow internally. The program makes and offers different courses focused on skills needed by Unisys employees. Company employees also have access to Unisys University, which provides free certifications for over 100 different skills. Courses cover topics such as management, team leadership, communication, and culture. The courses are organized around Unisys’ core business functions.

=== Carbon footprint reduction ===
In 2006, Unisys committed to reducing its carbon footprint by 75% by 2026. It achieved this five years early in 2021. A year later, the company announced a new goal of net zero carbon emissions by 2030. The company also participates in the Carbon Disclosure Project and UN Global Compact.

== Controversies ==
In 1987, Unisys was sued with Rockwell Shuttle Operations Company for $5.2 million by two former employees of the Unisys Corporation, one a subcontractor responsible for the computer programs for the space shuttle. The suit filed by Sylvia Robins, a former Unisys engineer, and Ria Solomon, who worked for Robins, charges that the two were forced from their jobs and harassed after complaining about safety violations and inflated costs.

In 1998, Unisys Corporation agreed to pay the government $2.25 million to settle allegations that it supplied refurbished, rather than new, computer materials to several federal agencies in violation of the terms of its contract. Unisys admitted to supplying re-worked or refurbished computer components to various civilian and military agencies in the early 1990s, when the contract required the company to provide new equipment. The market price for the refurbished material was less than the price for new material which the government paid.

In 1998, Unisys was found guilty of price inflation and government contract fraud, with the company settling to avoid further prosecution. Lockheed Martin and Unisys paid the government $3.15 million to settle allegations that Unisys inflated the prices of spare parts sold to the U.S. Department of Commerce for its NEXRAD Doppler Radar System, in violation of the False Claims Act, 31 U.S.C. § 3729, et seq.

In October 2005, The Washington Post reported that the company had allegedly overbilled on the $1-to-3-billion Transportation Security Administration contract for almost 171,000 hours of labor and overtime at up to the maximum rate of $131.13 per hour, including 24,983 hours not allowed by the contract. Unisys denied wrongdoing.

In 2007, Unisys was said to be under investigation by the FBI for allegedly failing to detect cybersecurity incidents related to the attacking of the U.S. Department of Homeland Security. Unisys reported that it had not been notified by the FBI or the Committee on Homeland Security of an investigation. The company denied all charges and said it had documentation disproving the allegations.

In 2007, Unisys was found guilty of misrepresentation of retiree benefits. A federal judge in Pennsylvania ordered Unisys to reinstate within 60 days free lifetime retiree medical benefits to 12 former employees who were employed by a Unisys predecessor, the Burroughs Corporation.

In 2007, there was a trademark infringement case between Visible Systems Corporation and Unisys. The court determined that Visible Systems had a right to a trademark in the word VISIBLE and that Unisys had to “permanently enjoin” from using the trademarks or service marks 3D VISIBLE ENTERPRISE, SD-VE, and VISIBLE to prevent customers from connecting Unisys with Visible Systems’ products or services.

In 2010, Unisys Hungary terminated the local Workers' Union representative Gabor Pinter's employment contract with immediate effect for raising concerns about unpaid overtime. According to the 2012 verdict of the Labour Court of Budapest, Unisys acted illegally and was ordered to pay unpaid wages and benefits, legal costs, and three months' average salary as compensation.

== See also ==
- CANDE
- Convergent Technologies
- Elliott ALGOL
- ES7000
- USAS (application)
- HOLMES2
- J. Presper Eckert
- LINC 4GL
- MAPPER
- NEWP
- Remington Rand
- Robert S. Barton
- System Development Corporation
- TeamQuest
- UNIVAC
- Work Flow Language
- Prémio Pessoa - a prize created by Unisys and the Portuguese newspaper Expresso
