= 2200 series =

2200 series may refer to:

== Train types ==
- 2200 series (CTA)
- Hankyu 2200 series electric multiple unit
- Keihan 2200 series electric multiple unit
- Meitetsu 2200 series, a Japanese train type

== Other uses ==
- Unisys 2200 Series system architecture
