= Unisys OS 2200 communications =

Aspect of Unisys OS 2200 operating system

The OS 2200 communications management system includes CPComm and MCB along with many programs that provide communications related functions such as file transfer, e-mail, and distributed transaction processing protocols.

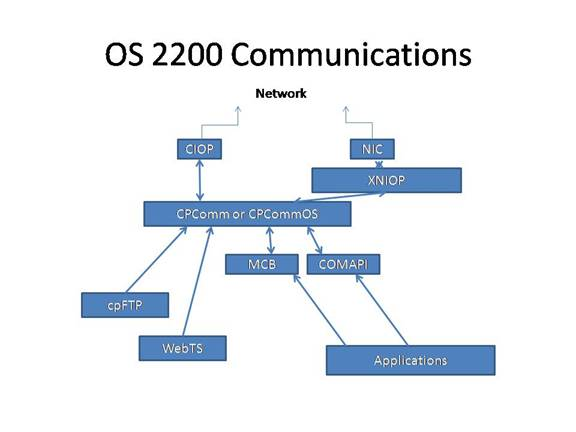

== CPComm ==
CPComm executes as a real time program in a background run. CPComm implements the protocol stacks.

CPComm communicates with the CIOP (Communications I/O Processor) to connect to networks. CPcommOS is a variant for 2200 Series systems implemented on Intel architectures. In the most recent systems only various speeds of Ethernet communications are supported. Previous systems supported ATM and FDDI but these were dropped through lack of interest.

CPComm and the Exec jointly handle authentication of connection requests and authorization for users and terminals to connect to time-sharing, and the various transaction application groups. SSL is supported for every connection. CPComm has software implementations of the encryption algorithms required for SSL.

CPComm includes the protocols and connections to time-sharing and transaction message queues. One of the most heavily used legacy protocols is INT1 which is a TCP/IP variant of the UNISCOPE/UTS green-screen terminal protocol.

TCP/IP v4 and TCP/IP v6 along with SNMP v1 and v3 are supported by CPComm.

== MCB ==
The Message Control Bank (MCB) is a protected subsystem that implements the message queues for transaction processing. It communicates with the transaction scheduler in the Exec. It also provides the APIs for applications to send and receive messages from the queues.

== COMAPI ==
COMAPI is a sockets implementation for OS2200. It is a protected subsystem that provides APIs for programs that wish to communicate directly with the network. In addition to all the traditional sockets APIs for C, APIs are provided for all the other programming languages.

== cpFTP ==
cpFTP is a program that provides both client and server FTP capability for OS 2200.

== WebTS ==
WebTS, the OS 2200 Web Transaction Server, is a full implementation of the HTTP and HTTPS protocol stacks. Server scripting using Java applets is supported, but the primary usage of WebTS is its full integration with OS 2200 including all security and transaction processing.

Transactions initiated via WebTS are subject to the same authentication as any other transaction and run with the same performance, scaling, and recovery. Such transactions may use the CGI APIs for communications with the client. Transactions developed for OS 2200 using the DPS display manager, typically require no changes or even recompilation to be fully operational with Web interfaces concurrently with terminals. Changes to DPS combined with client-side Java applets make everything transparent to the transaction program.
