= Unisys OS 2200 databases =

Aspect of Unisys OS 2200 operating system

The OS 2200 database managers are all part of the Universal Data System (UDS). UDS provides a common control structure for multiple different data models. Flat files (sequential, multi-keyed indexed sequential, MSAM, and fixed-block), network, and relational data models all share a common locking, recovery, and clustering mechanism. OS 2200 applications can use any mixture of these data models along with the high-volume transaction file system within the same program while retaining a single common recovery mechanism.

The database managers are implemented as a protected subsystem and are called procedures in user programs and other subsystems. The database managers support access using many common distributed data access protocols and APIs, including JDBC, OLE DB, and ODBC.

The heart of the database and transaction system is Integrated Recovery. "Integrated" implies the integration of all data models, the transaction file manager, the transaction scheduler, and the message queues. All activity in all of these areas is journaled (written on the audit trail). The audit trail is managed by Exec which ensures synchronization for all users. The Integrated Recovery Utility (IRU) provides database backup synchronized with executing transactions and audit trails.
