= Unisys OS 2200 distributed processing =

Aspect of Unisys OS 2200 operating system

OS 2200 supports all commonly used, and many not so commonly used, distributed processing protocols, APIs, and development technology.

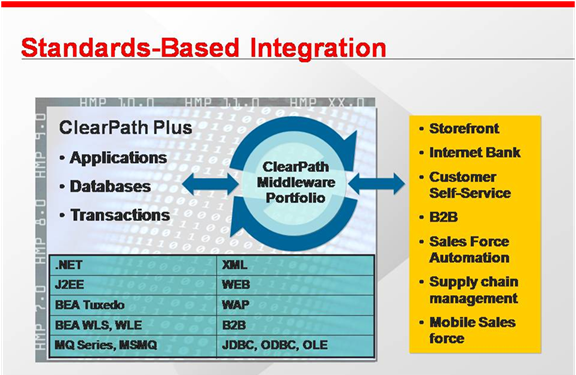

The X/Open Distributed Transaction Processing model and standards are the basis for much of the OS 2200 capability. Full support for the X/Open XA APIs including two-phase commit are built into transaction middleware, the database managers, and even clustering.

The J2EE model is also fully supported. It uses the XA capabilities of the system but provides the J2EE APIs and protocols.

IBM WebSphere MQ (AKA MQSeries), MSMQ, and others are all fully integrated into the system taking advantage of the XA and integrated recovery facilities.

== Distributed Transactions ==
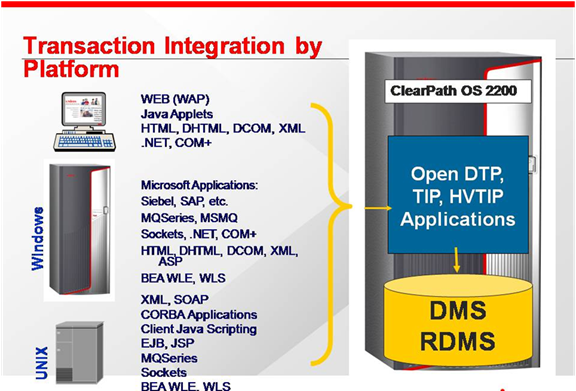

== Distributed Data Access ==
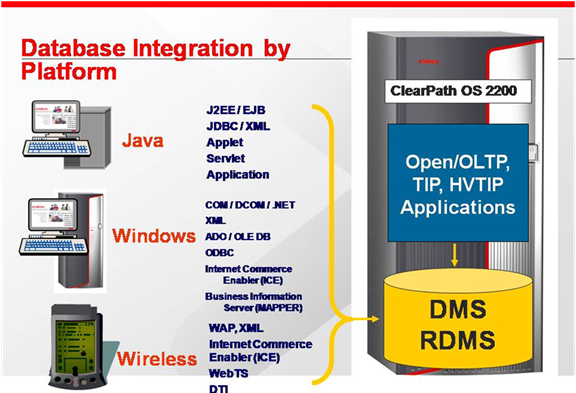

Access to OS 2200 data can be made from virtually any platform and technology.

Similarly, OS 2200 applications can access data on almost any other platform.

== Composite Applications ==
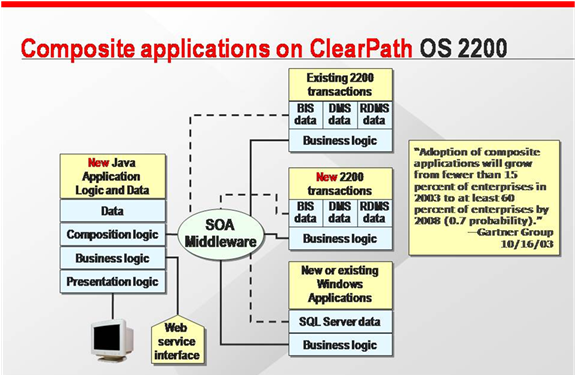

It is rare to find an application that is written completely in one language with one set of middleware. The languages and middleware continue to evolve and applications adopt new technologies when they best fit the business requirements. That is often dictated by the need to integrate with applications written by partners, clients, suppliers, and third-party software providers. They do not all make the same choices and are in any case evolving as well.

A composite application may be created by combining existing transaction logic with different middleware or a front-end written for a specific purpose. Unisys supports the X/Open DTP model (also implemented in Tuxedo) as Open DTP and J2EE. They fully interoperate with each other and with the rest of the system. Two-phase commit processing is supported within the database managers including clustered environments. Connectors are available to other common distributed transaction processing environments.
