= Thin-film memory =

Early high speed computer memory

Thin-film memory is a high-speed alternative to magnetic-core memory developed by Sperry Rand in a government-funded research project.

Instead of threading individual ferrite cores on wires, thin-film memory consisted of 4-micrometer thick dots of permalloy, an iron–nickel alloy, deposited on small glass plates by vacuum evaporation techniques and a mask. The drive and sense lines were then added using printed circuit wiring over the alloy dots. This provided very fast access times in the range of 670 nanoseconds, but was very expensive to produce.

In 1962, the UNIVAC 1107, intended for the civilian marketplace, used thin-film memory only for its 128-word general register stack. Military computers, where cost was less of a concern, used larger amounts of thin-film memory. Thin film was also used in a number of high-speed computer projects, including the high-end of the IBM System/360 line, but general advances in core tended to keep pace.
