= UNIVAC EXEC I =

Operating system for UNIVAC 1107 computer, 1962

EXEC I
- Developer: UNIVAC
- Working state: Discontinued
- Platforms: UNIVAC 1107
- Default user interface: Batch processing
- License: Proprietary

EXEC I is UNIVAC's original operating system developed for the UNIVAC 1107 in 1962. EXEC I is a batch processing operating system that supports multiprogramming.

== See also ==
- UNIVAC EXEC II
- List of UNIVAC products
- History of computing hardware
