= UNIVAC EXEC II =

Operating system for UNIVAC 1107 computer, 1962

EXEC II
- Developer: Computer Sciences Corporation
- Working state: Discontinued
- Platforms: UNIVAC 1107
- Default user interface: Batch processing
- License: Proprietary

EXEC II is a discontinued operating system developed for the UNIVAC 1107 by Computer Sciences Corporation (CSC) while under contract to UNIVAC to develop the machine's COBOL compiler. They developed EXEC II because Univac's EXEC I operating system development was late. Because of this the COBOL compiler was actually designed to run under EXEC II, not EXEC I as specified in the original contract.

EXEC II is a batch processing operating system that supports a single job stream with concurrent spooling.

== See also ==
- List of UNIVAC products
- History of computing hardware
