= List of UNIVAC products =

This is a list of UNIVAC products. It ends in 1986, the year that Sperry Corporation merged with Burroughs Corporation to form Unisys as a result of a hostile takeover bid launched by Burrough's CEO W. Michael Blumenthal.

== The Remington Rand years (1950 to 1955) ==
=== Calculating devices ===
- UNIVAC 40
- UNIVAC 60
- UNIVAC 120

=== Computer systems ===
- UNIVAC I
- UNIVAC 1101
- UNIVAC 1102
- UNIVAC 1103
- UNIVAC 1104

=== Peripherals ===
==== Storage ====
- UNISERVO tape drive

==== Display and print ====
- UNIVAC High speed printer 600 line/min printer

=== Offline tape handling units ===
- UNIPRINTER 10 char/s printer with tape drive
- UNITYPER keyboard with tape drive
- UNIVAC Tape to Card converter card punch with tape drive
- UNIVAC Card to Tape converter card reader with tape drive
- UNIVAC Paper Tape to Tape converter paper tape reader with tape drive

== The Sperry Rand years (1955 to 1978) ==
=== Calculating devices ===
- UNIVAC 1004
- UNIVAC 1005

=== Computer systems ===
==== Embedded systems ====
- AN/USQ-17 – the Naval Tactical Data System (NTDS) or M-460
- AN/USQ-20 – updated NTDS, a.k.a. UNIVAC 1206 or G-40
- AN/UYK-5 18-bit (octal) digital CPU Military System (Navy/Marines) used for logistics/pay/maintenance management (Navy Shipboard, Marines Portable)
- AN/UYK-7 – multiprocessor for Aegis. 32-bit replacement for the Naval Tactical Data System, derived from UNIVAC 1108
- AN/UYK-8 – dual processor version of the Naval Tactical Data System
- AN/UYK-20
- AN/UYK-43 – replaced and shared its instruction set with the AN/UYK-7
- AN/UYK-44 – replaced and shared its instruction set with the AN/UYK-20
- UNIVAC 1218 – real-time computer
- UNIVAC 1230 – later, faster (2×) version of the AN/USQ-20 (memory size and I/O were identical)
- UNIVAC 1824 – 24-bit digital computer for on-board missile guidance, Univac's first to use monolithic integrated circuits
- CP-823/U / UNIVAC 1830 – airborne 30-bit digital computer for the A-NEW project ASW (Anti-Submarine Warfare) development of the Lockheed P-3 Orion

==== Word machines ====
- LARC
- UNIVAC File Computer - Used by Eastern Air Lines in an early Reservation system.
- UNIVAC Solid State
- UNIVAC II
- UNIVAC III
- UNIVAC 418 – real-time computer
- UNIVAC 418-II – real-time computer
- UNIVAC 418-III – real-time computer
- UNIVAC 422 - Univac Digital Trainer, part of the Programmed Educational Package (Prep)
- UNIVAC 490 – commercial adaptation of AN/USQ real-time system
- UNIVAC 492
- UNIVAC 494
- UNIVAC 494-MAPS – The first Multi-Associated Processor System - not made available commercially
- UNIVAC 1103A
- UNIVAC 1104
- UNIVAC 1105
- UNIVAC 1100/2200 series:

- UNIVAC 1106 (half-speed 1108)
- UNIVAC 1107
- UNIVAC 1108
- UNIVAC 1110
- UNIVAC 1100/10 (1106 upgraded with semiconductor memory)
- UNIVAC 1100/20 (1108 upgraded with semiconductor memory)
- UNIVAC 1100/40 (1110 upgraded with semiconductor memory)
- UNIVAC 1100/82A
- UNIVAC 1100/181

==== Variable word length machines ====
- UNIVAC 1050

==== Byte machines ====
These machines implemented a variant of the IBM System/360 architecture

- UNIVAC 9000 series
  - UNIVAC 9200
  - UNIVAC 9300
  - UNIVAC 9400
  - UNIVAC 9480

=== Peripherals ===
==== Storage ====
- FH-432 (Flying Head) drum
- FH-880 (Flying Head) drum
- FH-1782 (Flying Head) drum
- FASTRAND drum drive
- RANDEX drum drive
- UNISERVO I tape drive
- UNISERVO II tape drive
- UNISERVO IIA tape drive
- UNISERVO III tape drive
- UNISERVO IIIC tape drive
- UNISERVO VI-C tape drive
- UNISERVO VIII-C tape drive
- UNISERVO 12 tape drive (1600 BPI)
- UNISERVO 16 tape drive (1600 BPI)
- UNISERVO 20 tape drive (1600 BPI)
- UNISERVO 30-36 tape drives (6250 BPI)(OEM from STK)

==== Display and print ====
- Uniscope

==== Communication ====
- UNIVAC BP - Buffer Processor; used as communications front-end to 418 and 490
- UNIVAC CTMC - Communications Terminal Module Controller
- UNIVAC GCS - General Communications System

=== Software ===
==== Operating systems and system software ====
- BOSS III or Business Oriented Systems Supervisor was the operating system for the UNIVAC III
- EXEC I
- EXEC II
- EXEC 8

==== Utilities, languages, and development aids ====
Program	Code	Notes
CALL Macro Processor	CALL	
CSHELL Command Shell	CSHELL	
Conversational TimeSharing	CTS	
Univac Text Editor	ED	
Full-Screen Editor	FSED	
Interactive Processing Facility	IPF	
Logically Integrated FORTRAN Translator	LIFT	
Symbolic Stream Generator	SSG	
Table of Contents Editor	TOCED	Edits table of contents, privileged users can read the master file directory and interface with the print system.
Transaction Interface Package	TIP	
UEDIT	UEDIT	
Client Server Development	UTS-400	COBOL
MAPPER (Software)	MAPPER	4GL
Programming Language for UNISYS Systems	PLUS	
Master File Directory	MFD	
SX1100	SX1100	UNIX on Exec8, OS1100 and OS2200
CS1100	CS1100	Communications Simulator
Traffic Control Language	TCL	

==== Applications ====
- USAS

== The Sperry Corporation years (1978 to 1986) ==
- UNIVAC 1100/2200 series:

- UNIVAC 1100/60
- UNIVAC 1100/70
- UNIVAC 1100/80
- UNIVAC 1100/90

- UNIVAC Integrated Scientific Processor (ISP)

- UNIVAC Series 90:

- UNIVAC 90/25
- UNIVAC 90/30
- UNIVAC 90/40
- UNIVAC 90/60
- UNIVAC 90/70
- UNIVAC 90/80
