= UNIVAC 1050 =

Second-generation mainframe computer

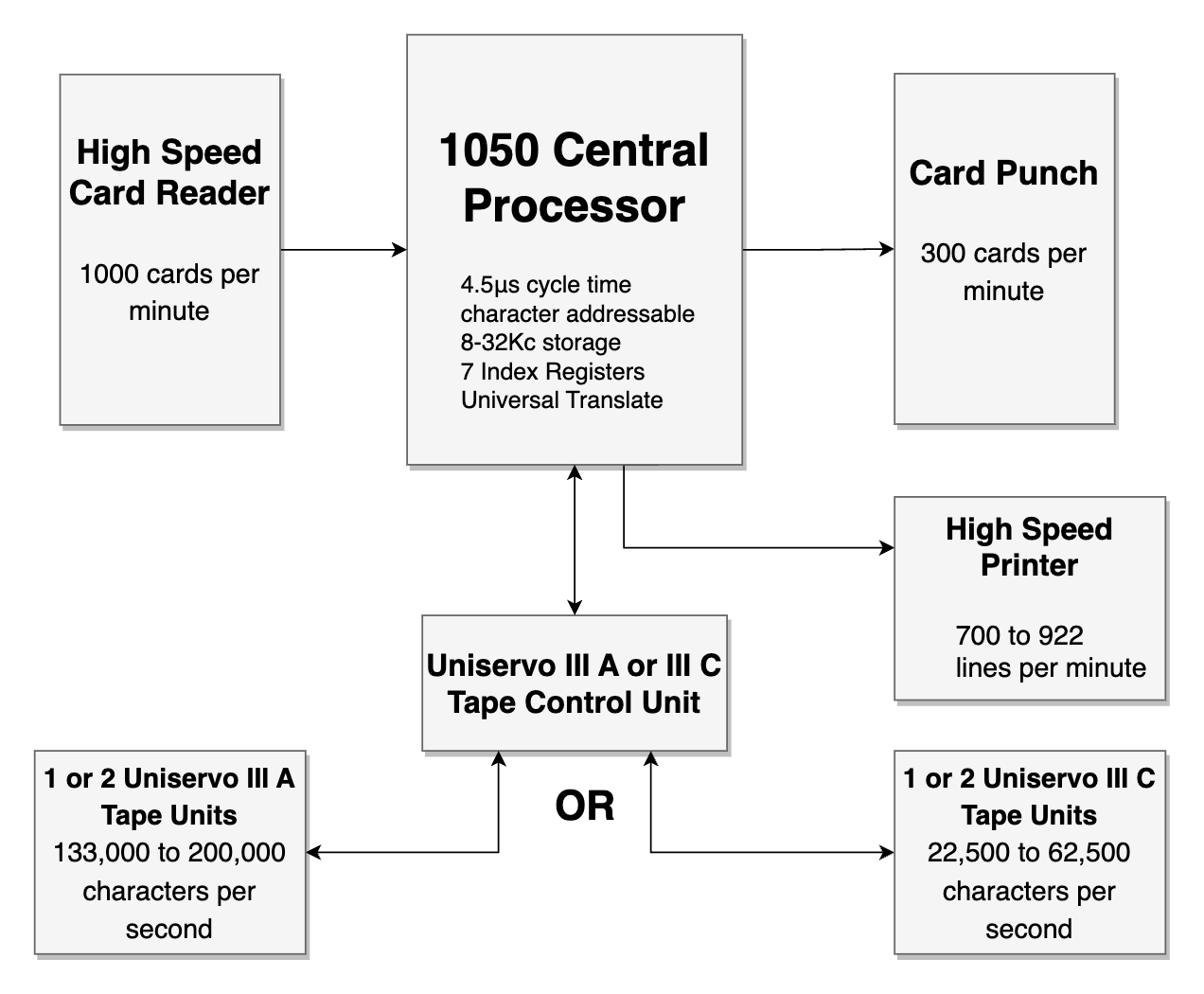
Block diagram of a UNIVAC 1050

The UNIVAC 1050 is a model of decimal and binary computer. It was announced in May 1962 as an off-line input-output processor for larger UNIVAC systems.

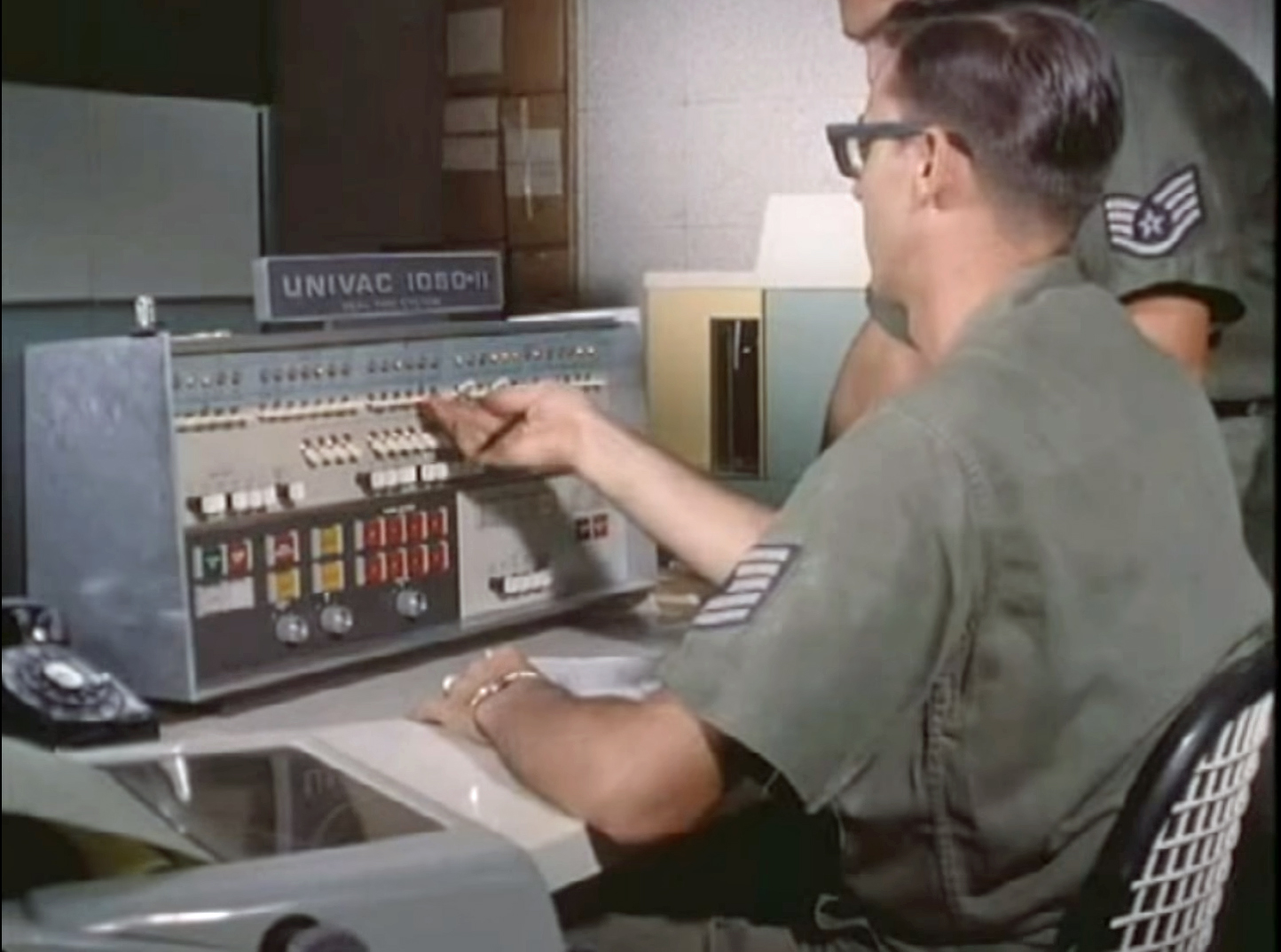
UNIVAC 1050-II console

Instructions were fixed length (30 bits – five characters), consisting of a five-bit "op code", a three-bit index register specifier, one reserved bit, a 15-bit address, and a six-bit "detail field" whose function varies with each instruction. The memory was up to 32K of six-bit characters. It has a variable word-length (one to 16 characters).

The first 256 memory positions were grouped into 64 fields of four characters each, called "tetrads", it is possible to address any of these positions either by tetrad or by individual character. These tetrads were used to implement the following:

- 2 x Arithmetic Registers (each 16 characters wide)
- 7 x Index Registers (each 3 characters wide)
- Multiplier and Quotient (each 4 characters wide)
- 6 x I/O Channels

Like the IBM 1401, the 1050 was commonly used as an off-line peripheral controller in many installations of both large "scientific computers and large "business computers". In these installations the big computer (e.g., a UNIVAC III) did all of its input-output on magnetic tapes and the 1050 was used to format input data from other peripherals (e.g., punched card readers) on the tapes and transfer output data from the tapes to other peripherals (e.g., punched card punches or the line printer).

UNIVAC 1050 high-speed printer ca. 1965

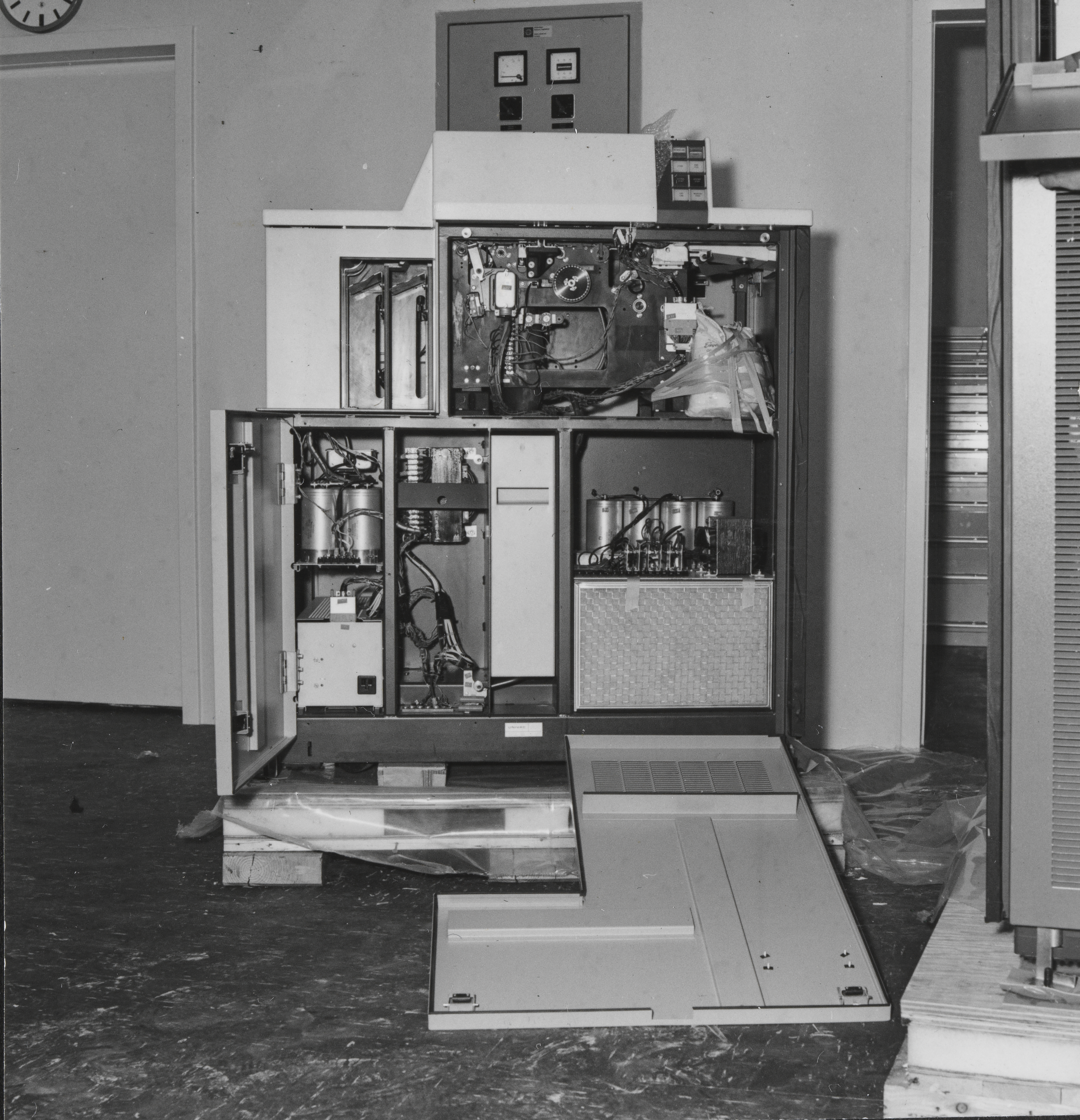
UNIVAC 1050 card punch ca. 1965

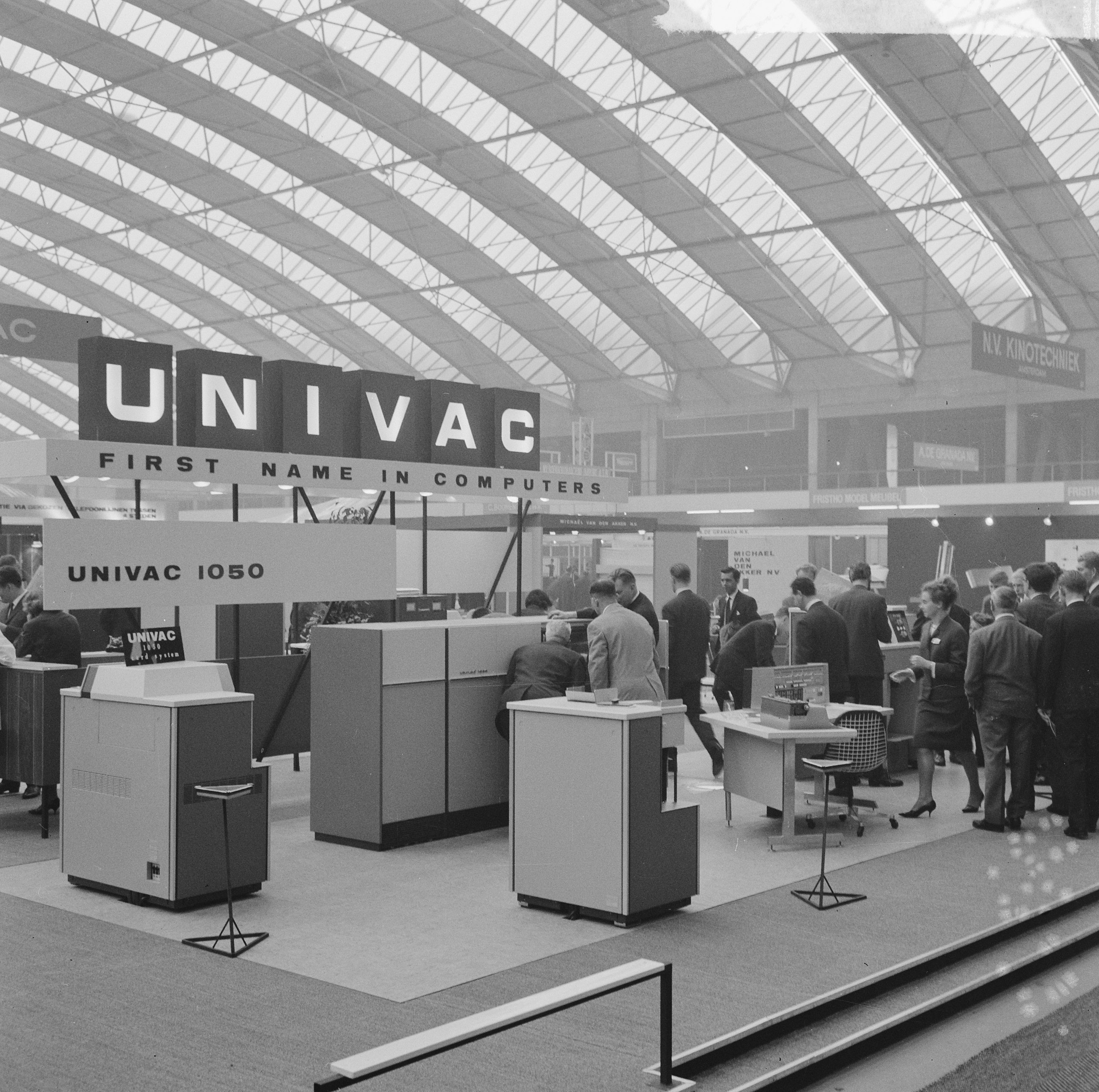
UNIVAC 1050, Netherlands 1964

A version used by the U.S. Air Force, the U1050-II real-time system, had some extra peripherals. The most significant of these was the FASTRAND 1 Drum Storage Unit. This physically large device had two contra-rotating drums mounted horizontally, one above the other in a pressurized cabinet. Read-write heads were mounted on a horizontally moving beam between the drums, driven by a voice coil servo external to the pressurized cabinet. This high-speed access subsystem allowed the real-time operation. Another feature was the communications subsystem with modem links to remote sites. A UNISERVO VI-C tape drive provided an audit trail for the transactions. Other peripherals were the card reader and punch, and printer. The operator's console had the 'stop and go' buttons and a Teletype Model 33 teleprinter for communication and control. The initial Air Force order in November 1963 was for 152 systems.

Other operators include the Union Bank of Switzerland (SBG) who operated a number of UNIVAC 1050s in concert with a pair of UNIVAC 492s from 1965 onwards.

Subsequently, UNIVAC released the 1050 Model III (1050-III) and 1050 Model IV (1050-IV) for general-purpose commercial usage. The key difference between the two models was that of performance and expandability. The 1050-IV could be expanded to 64K of character addressable memory which could access two characters at a time with a cycle time of 2 microseconds per access (vs. 4.5 microseconds in the 1050-III). Both models supported Decimal Multiply/Divide as an upgrade option.
