= UNIVAC BP =

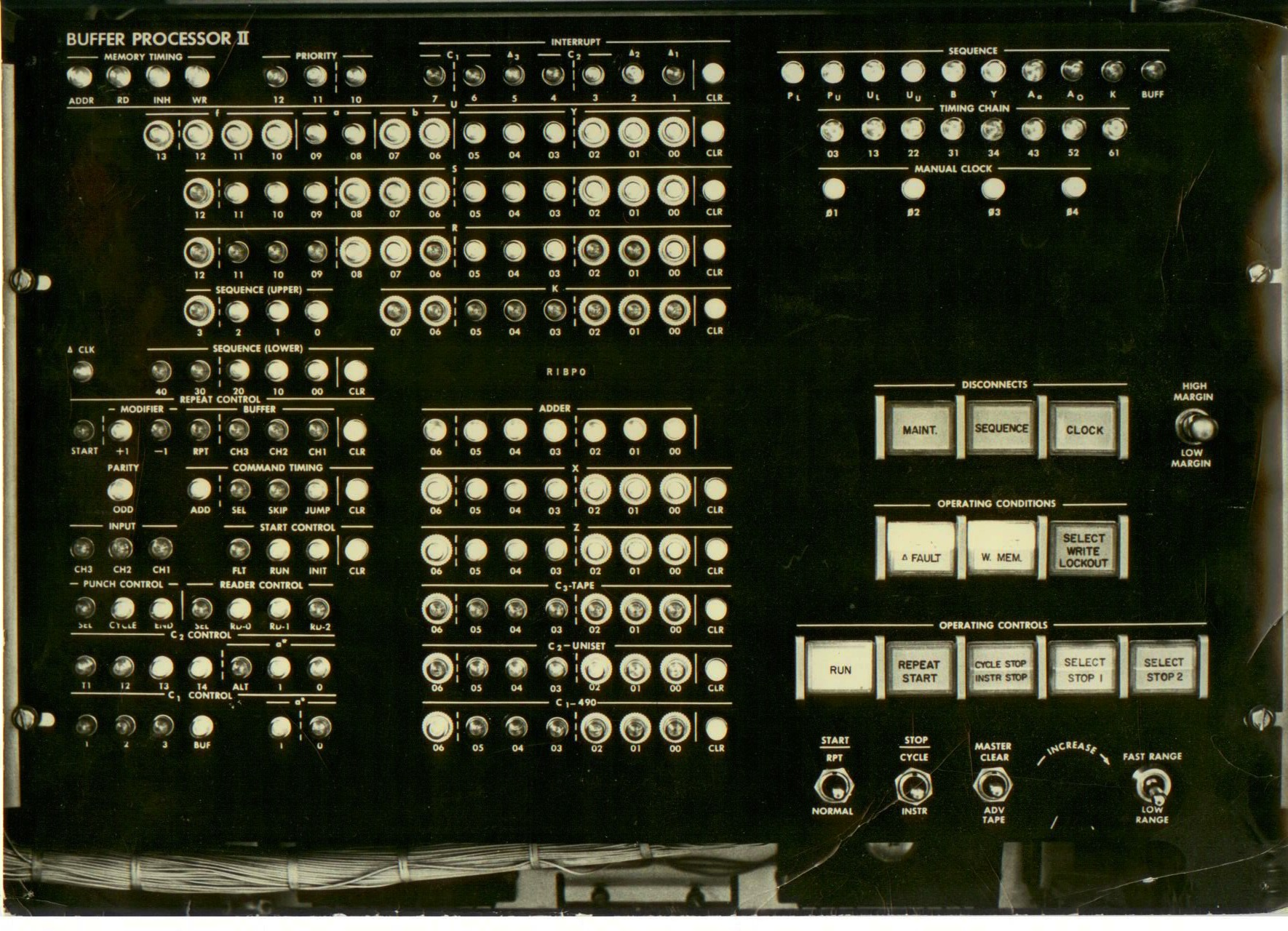
Univac Buffer Processor Maintenance Panel

The Univac Buffer Processor (BP) is an obsolete minicomputer manufactured by UNIVAC from 1962 to 1965 used in several real-time computer system installations in the 1960s as a network concentrator and front end system to the UNIVAC 418 and UNIVAC 490/494 real-time systems.

A notable set of installations was at British European Airways in London (the BEACON Online Reservations system). The initial reservations system at B.E.A. comprised over 200 agent sets in London, connected to the Univac 490 via a network of eight Univac Buffer Processors.

Subsequently, in 1966, the B.E.A. reservations network was expanded to include agents in offices in Manchester, Birmingham, Glasgow, Bristol and Edinburgh and later to B.E.A. offices in selected cities on the European continent. The expansion of the network was accomplished by cascading the installation of Buffer Processors such that remote offices would have a BP installation in the offices, networked into the BP concentrators at the London central site.

The Buffer Processor's internal structure comprised 32,768 "words" of 9 bits each.
