= USAS (application) =

Series of mainframe applications

USAS is software suite for mainframe computers, mainly intended for use in the airline, transportation, and hospitality industries. It is made up of a series of diverse and relatively complex applications written for the Unisys 1100-series, 2200-series, and Clearpath IX environments.

All Nippon Airways became the first company to adopt the system in the late 1970s. Its name was originally an acronym for Univac Standard Airline Systems, but the product line is now referred to simply as "USAS". With advancements in computing, USAS is slowly being replaced in the airline industry with other software, with Unisys also developing AirCore to replace its USAS offering.

== Applications in the suite ==
USAS was mainly developed for use by airlines. Check-in, reservations, and cargo operations are therefore among its main components. The original USAS applications such as USAS*RES (Reservation System), USAS*CGO (Cargo Application) were written in the early 70s and have been adapted in different forms in varying degrees of customization.

Most (if not all) USAS applications are written as text-based online transaction systems which are designed for low overhead and fast response times. The environment most commonly used is HVTIP (Unisys' High-Volume Transaction Processing).

== Development ==
Older USAS applications such as USAS*RES (Reservations System) or USAS*FDC (Flight Data Control) were written originally in Fortran, but elements of various applications were also written in COBOL, Unisys 1100/2200 assembly language (ASM or MASM), and the LINC 4GL. Lufthansa plays a major role in developing the USAS suite.

== Current Users ==
- Unisys Cargo Hosting Services, Minneapolis :: Delta Cargo, Air Canada Cargo
- Air Iberia
- Travel Sky, China
- Amadeus
- NorthWest (cargo)
- Cathay Pacific
- Qantas Airways
- Air India

== See also ==
- List of UNIVAC products
