= UNIVAC High speed printer =

The UNIVAC High speed printer read metal UNIVAC magnetic tape using a UNISERVO tape drive and printed the data from the tape at 600 lines per minute. Each line could contain 130 characters in its fixed-width font.
