= Peripheral =

Auxiliary input/output device for a computer

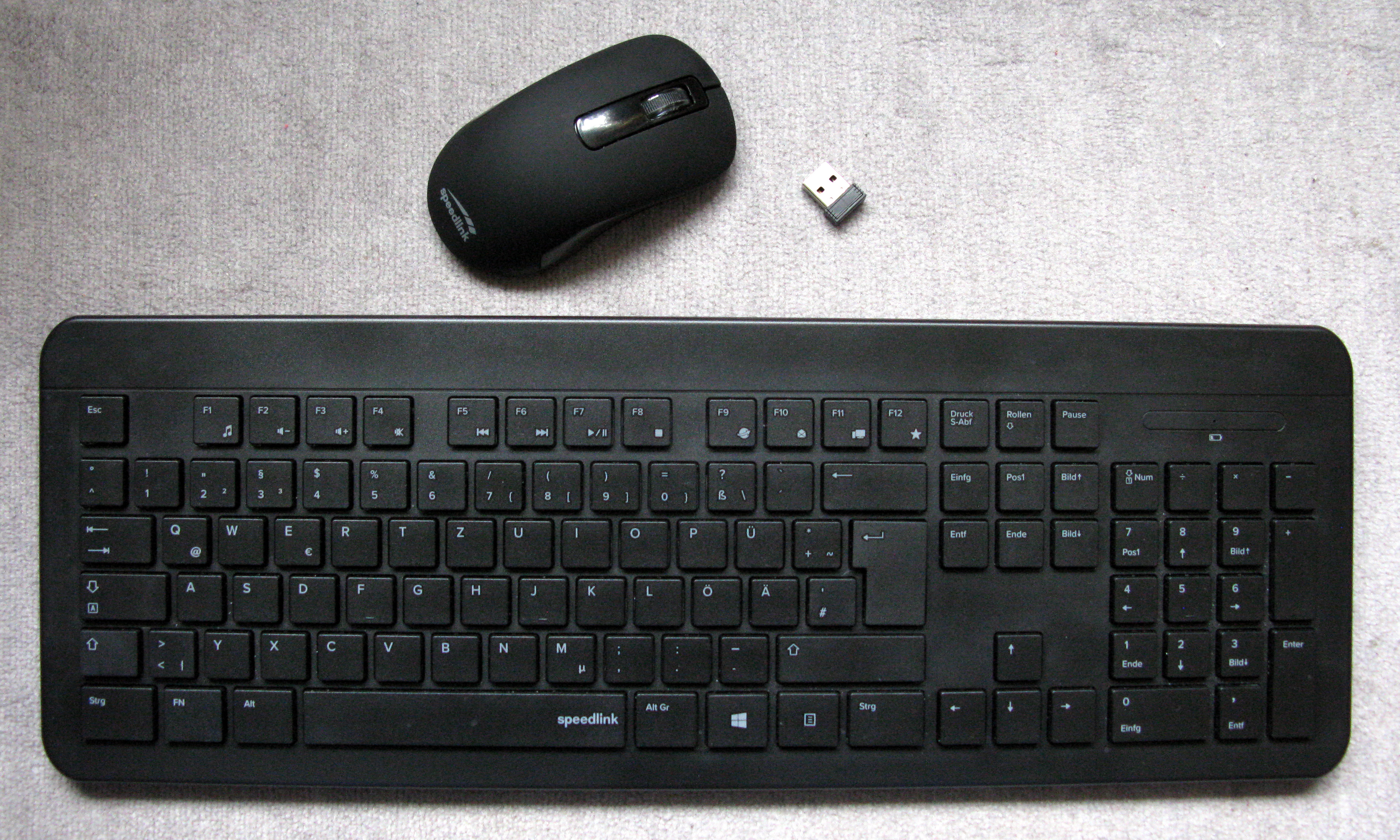
A computer keyboard and mouse, a common type of computer peripheral

A peripheral device, or simply peripheral, is an auxiliary hardware device that a computer uses to transfer information externally. A peripheral is a hardware component that is accessible to and controlled by a computer but is not a core component of the computer. It can communicate with a computer through wired or Wireless connections. Many modern electronic devices, such as Internet-enabled digital watches, video game consoles, smartphones, and tablet computers, have interfaces for use as a peripheral.

Mouses and keyboards became the standard for computer peripheral input devices in the 1970s, while memory storage devices continued to be developed in new ways. Output devices, such as monitors, began as cathode ray tubes, before switching to LCD monitors in the 1980s.

== Types ==
A peripheral can be categorized based on the direction in which information flows relative to the computer, and is usually categorised one of three ways: Input, output and storage.

=== Input device ===
Broadly speaking, an input device converts incoming data into binary code, expressed through electrical signals, which is comprehensible to a computer. This includes not just user-inputted information such as instructions, but also potentially information about the environment, such as temperature or pressure. Input devices in turn can be categorized based on:

- Modality of output (e.g., mechanical motion, audio, visual, etc.)
- Whether the output is discrete (e.g., pressing of key) or continuous (e.g., a mouse's position, though digitized into a discrete quantity, is fast enough to be considered continuous)
- The number of degrees of freedom involved (e.g., two-dimensional traditional mice, or three-dimensional navigators designed for CAD applications)

Examples include a mouse, keyboard, scanner, game controller, microphone and webcam.

=== Output device ===
An output device reverses the process of an input device, turning binary code for machines into comprehensible input for a user. A display device is the most common form of output device which presents output visually on computer screen. The output appears temporarily on the screen and can easily be altered or erased. With all-in-one PCs, notebook computers, hand held PCs and other devices; the term display screen is used for the display device. The display devices are also used in home entertainment systems, mobile systems, cameras and video game systems.

Display devices form images by illuminating a desired configuration of Raster display devices are organized in the form of a 2-dimensional matrix with rows and columns. This is done many times within a second, typically 60, 75, 120 or 144 Hz on consumer devices.

Other examples include a monitor, printer, headphones, and speakers.

=== Storage device ===
Many external storage devices double as input/output devices, as in addition to storing information, they also need facilities for loading information on and off the memory (input), and showing the user what is being stored (output).

Examples include: storage device (such as disk drive, solid-state drive, USB flash drive, memory card and tape drive), modem, router, gateway and network adapter

== History ==
One of the earliest known computer peripherals to be made was the punched card, which was first introduced into computing in the late 1880s by Herman Hollerith, an American engineer. As a result, the punched card tabulator was invented, which was able to read the punch cards. In addition, it was the first computer peripheral to be mass-produced. In 1901, the introduction of the punched card also led to the creation of the Hollerith Type 001 Mechanical Card Punch, would become the basis of computer keyboards. The keypunch allowed operators to punch the digits 0-9, without the user having prior knowledge of the corresponding card codes.

Punched tape was later used instead of punched cards as a computer peripheral, because of its lower cost, and higher storage capacity. Programs were written to punched tape using existing teleprinters, then were transferred to a reader so that a computer could load the program. The first documented computer to use punched tape as storage was the Zuse Z1, released in 1938 by German inventor Konrad Zuse. which was able to read source code on punched tape.

In the early 1950s, the UNISERVO I, created for the UNIVAC I computer, became the first commercially available magnetic tape drive. Magnetic tape drives have both the ability to read and write to magnetic tape. Magnetic tape is often used to backup or archive digital data for long periods of time, due to its higher cost efficiency compared to other storage mediums, and because it is not possible cannot both read and write to magnetic tape at the same time.

In 1956, the IBM 305 RAMAC was the first the first commercial computer to ship with a hard disk, the IBM Model 350. The IBM Model 350 was the first hard disk, and it had the ability to be randomly read and written to at any time. The hard drive was able to store 5 MB of storage. To achieve this, it used fifty magnetic disks, that were double sided and had a diameter of 24 inches each, spinning at 1200 RPM.

In the early 1960s, the RS-232 standard was developed by the Electronic Industries Association. The standard was designed on the belief that it would provide reliable connections, and to allow the interconnection of devices made by different manufacturers. The standard allowed devices to communicate via serial connections, using a D25 connector.

Personal computers began to be widespread from the 1970s onwards, and while the existing peripherals such as keyboards and mice became standard, new peripherals also began development, such as scanners and webcams.

IBM began using semiconductor memory in 1970, which could store twice as much data as core memory. Flash memory was invented in 1984.

== See also ==
- Display device
- Expansion card
- Punched card input/output
- Punched tape
- Video game accessory
