= CP-823/U =

Digital airborne computing system

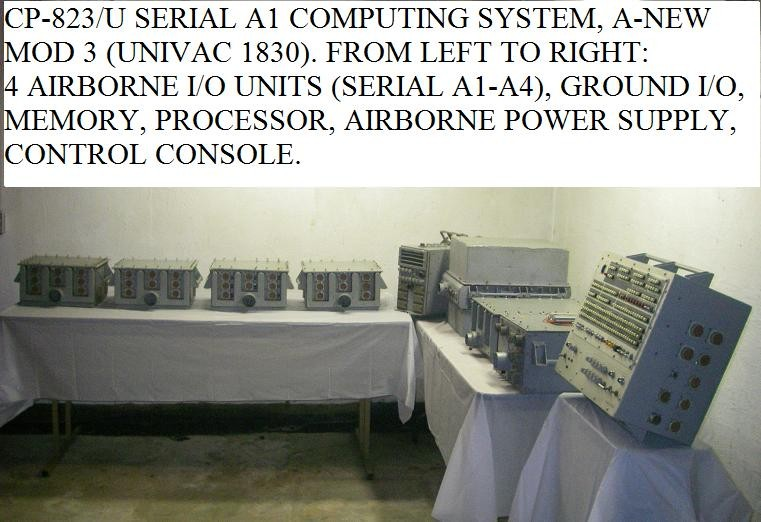
P-3 Orion Prototype Digital Computer

The CP-823/U, also known as the UNIVAC 1830, was the first airborne 30-bit digital computer. It was engineered, built and tested as the A-NEW MOD3 prototype computer for the Lockheed P-3 Orion.

== Requirements ==
In 1963, the US Navy's Bureau of Naval Weapons, Naval Air Development Center contracted Univac Defense Systems Division of Sperry-Rand to perform a study of the feasibility of a central digital computer for the avionics of the Navy’s Project A-NEW, the ASW (Anti-Submarine Warfare) development for the Lockheed P-3 Orion. The idea was to develop and build the first central digital computing system able to coordinate the many sensors, MPD (Multipurpose Display) and tactical air command functions.

The study, Final Report on Avionics Unit Computer Study 10-21-63, concluded that a miniature, modular, digital avionics computer could be engineered, built and tested using current developing technologies.

After a meeting in January 1964 with representatives from Univac and the Naval Air Development Center, contracts worth almost $2 million were awarded to Univac Defense Systems Division to engineer, build and test the first 30-bit digital airborne computer, the CP-823/U (UNIVAC 1830) engineering prototype, for the A-NEW MOD3 test aircraft.

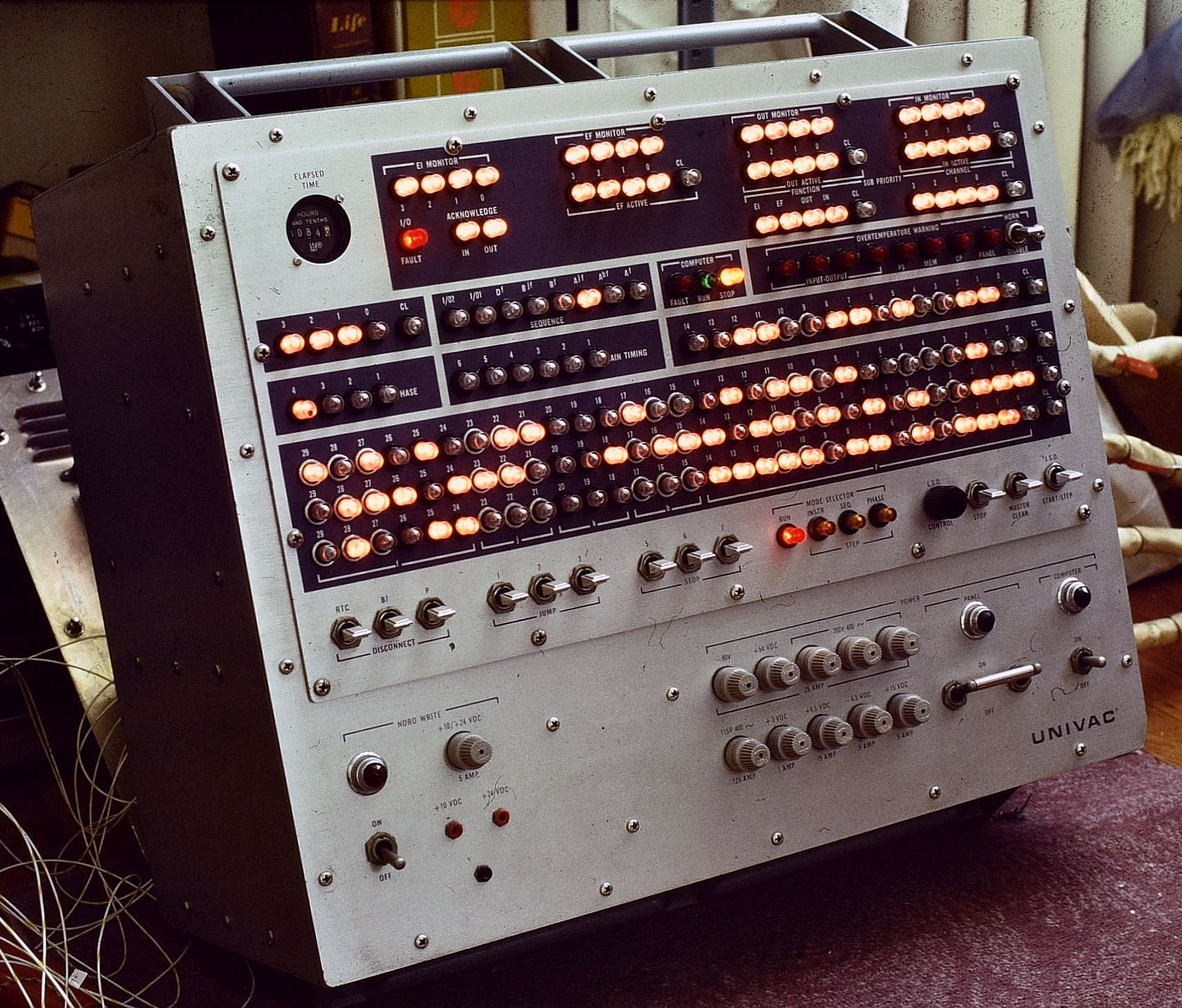
Control Console of UNIVAC 1830 / CP-823/U Computer. This is from the system in the photo, above. This view is with the program halted.

This would be Univac’s first computer to use flatpack monolithic integrated circuits, using diode-transistor logic (DTL). This technology was simultaneously being developed for use in the UNIVAC 1824 for the missile guidance program. It was also their first computer to lay the electronics flat, on a printed circuit card, instead of on-end like the cordwood block electronics modules, (Burndy packs).

The CP-823/U Computing System, Serial A1, (UNIVAC 1830), A-NEW MOD3 was delivered to the Naval Air Development Center, Johnsville, PA in 1965. It consisted of a Control Console (Maintenance Panel), combined Airborne Power Supply, Central Processor, 32,000 30-bit Memory unit, four Airborne I/O units, Ground I/O unit and cables.

== Design ==
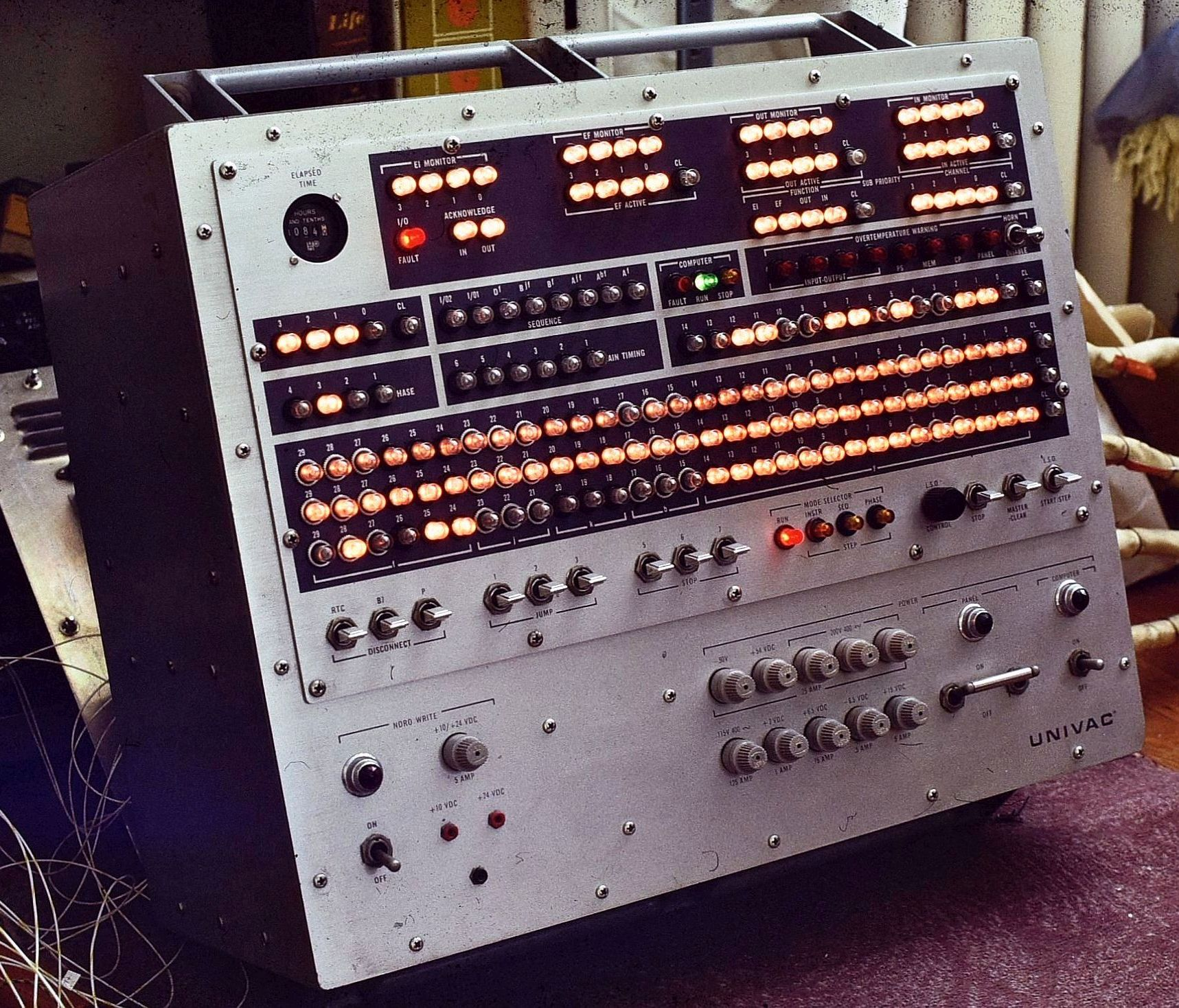
This view is with the program running.

The UNIVAC 1830, Navy designated CP-823/U, was a digital computer which received problems and data and processed answers in numerical form. It used parallel binary arithmetic and logic operations; word length was 30 bits. All of the central processor (C.P.) logic and I/O logic control was microelectronic circuitry, constructed of integrated, monolithic semiconductor elements (resistors, diodes and transistors contained within a single chip of silicon). Logic cards that were not microelectronic are the master clock cards in the C.P and the input amplifier and output data driver cards in the I/O units.

In the A-NEW integrated system, the CP-823/U airborne digital computer performed many functions aboard the Lockheed P-3 Orion test aircraft. It continuously computed the aircraft’s latitude and longitude, calculated optimum deployment of sonobuoys, kept tabs on their location with respect to the moving aircraft and determined estimated target positions from data supplied by all aircraft sensors. The computer used statistical techniques to derive several possible courses of action, displaying these and the computed probability of success, for final selection by the aircraft commander. Other tasks which were performed by the integrated Anti-Submarine Warfare Prototype CP-823/U computer included: Search and Correlation, Automatic and Extended Tracking, Enemy Submarine Identification, Attack and Post Flight Evaluation.

== Development ==
The extensive testing (1965–1968) of the CP-823/U (Univac 1830) prototype Computing System integrated with the rest of the A-NEW MOD3 sensor and display system in and out of the P3 Orion test aircraft, eventually resulted in the U.S. Navy, Bureau of Weapons approval. On June 24, 1966 UNIVAC received a contract for design, development, testing and delivery of the computer. Production deliveries began in 1967.

The resulting general purpose computer was the CP-901 / ASQ-114 (Univac 1830A), used in the Lockheed P-3C Orion ASW aircraft. The general purpose nature of this computer was so broad that it was even considered to use the idle computing power of aircraft on the ground for squadron administrative computing. This involved the development of a general purpose operating system, an assembler and FORTRAN compiler.
