= Remington Rand 409 =

UNIVAC 60
- Manufacturer: Remington Rand
- Released: 1952; 74 years ago
- Successor: UNIVAC 120

UNIVAC 120
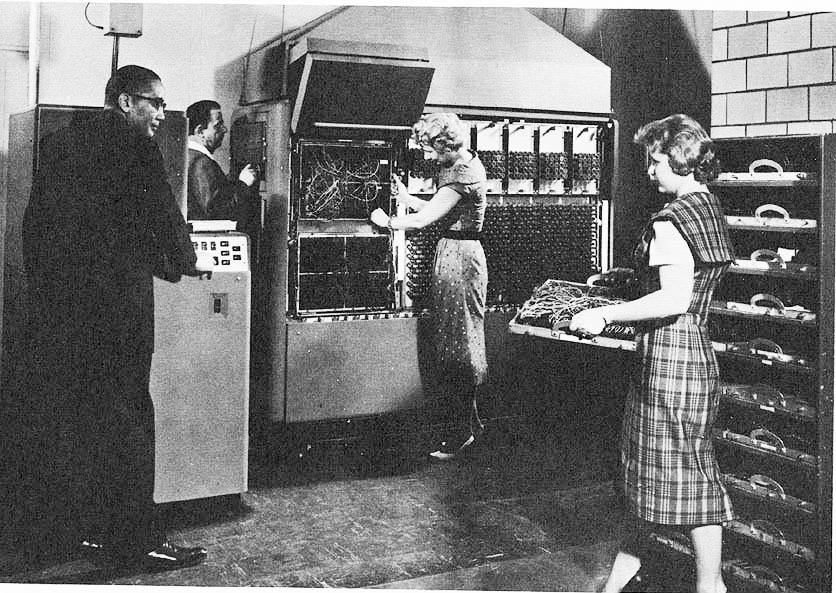
- UNIVAC 120
- Manufacturer: Remington Rand
- Released: 1953; 73 years ago
- Weight: 3,230 lb
- Predecessor: UNIVAC 60
- Successor: UNIVAC 1004

UNIVAC 40
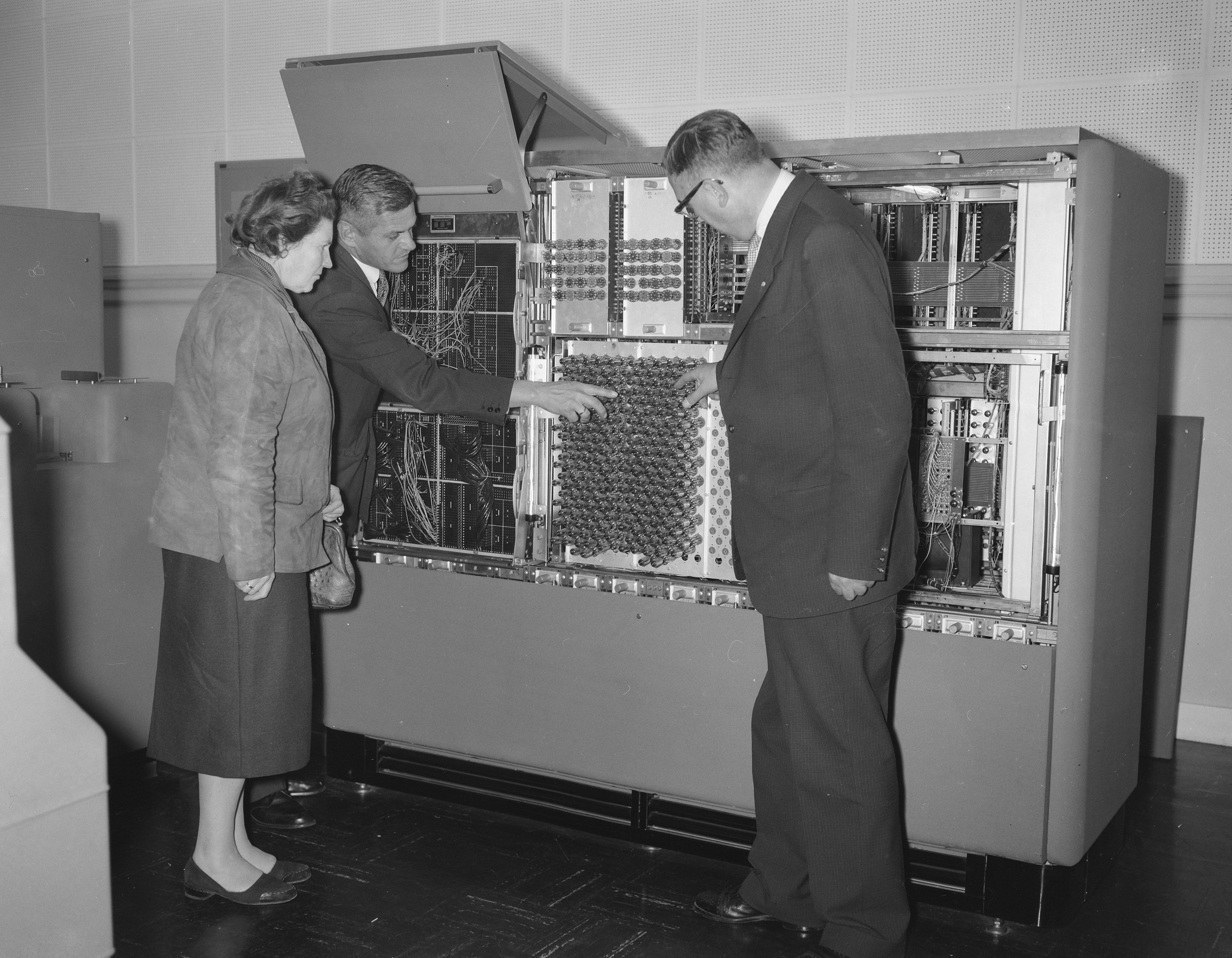
- Commissioning of the Remington Rand UNIVAC 40 at the Groningen Low Voltage Network Construction and Operations Company, with Dr. Max Euwe, a scientific advisor of Remington Rand, giving an explanation.
- Manufacturer: Remington Rand
- Released: 1955; 71 years ago
- Introductory price: $240,000
- Related: UNIVAC 60 and UNIVAC 120

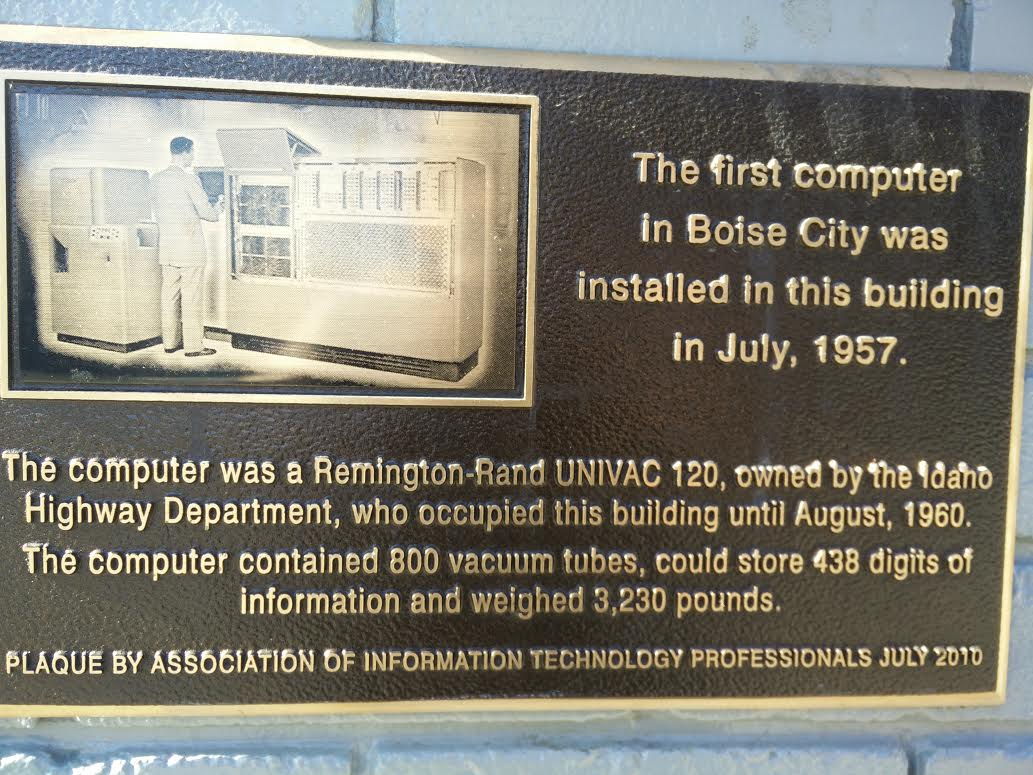
A UNIVAC 120 served as the first computer in Boise, Idaho

The Remington Rand 409, is a series of punched card calculators that were programmed with a plugboard. The prototype model was designed in 1949 and finished completion in 1951.

The commercial version was sold in three models:

- the UNIVAC 60, which released in December of 1951 (delivered in early 1952), originally under the name Remington RAND 409-2. Before rebranding as the UNIVAC 60, the machine underwent revisions 409-2R, 409-2A, and finally 409-2B. In particular, the jump from 409-2R to 409-A replaced relays with cold cathodes that resulted in faster response times.
- the UNIVAC 120, which released in 1953.
- the UNIVAC 40, which released in 1955.

The model number referred to the number of decimal digits the device could read from each punched card.

The machine was designed in "The Barn", at 33 Highland Ave. in Rowayton, Connecticut, a building that currently houses the Rowayton Public Library and Community Center.

These machines were discontinued when the UNIVAC 1004 was introduced in 1962. A total of 1080 units of the series had been produced by the end of 1961.

== Architecture ==
Numbers were fixed-point and of variable length (one to ten digits). Arithmetic was done in floating point, but all results were converted to fixed point when stored in memory.

Digits are represented in bi-quinary coded decimal. Each digit of memory storage contained five tubes. Four of these represented the digits 1, 3, 5, and 7, while the fifth tube represented 9 if activated alone but added 1 to the value if activated together with another tube.

Digit	1	3	5	7	9
0					
1	*				
2	*				*
3		*			
4		*			*
5			*		
6			*		*
7				*	
8				*	*
9					*

== Hardware ==
RR 409	model 60	model 120
Number of tubes	?	800
Decimal digits of storage	?	438
Weight	?	3,230 lb

== See also ==
- List of UNIVAC products
- History of computing hardware
- List of vacuum-tube computers
