= UNIVAC 1102 =

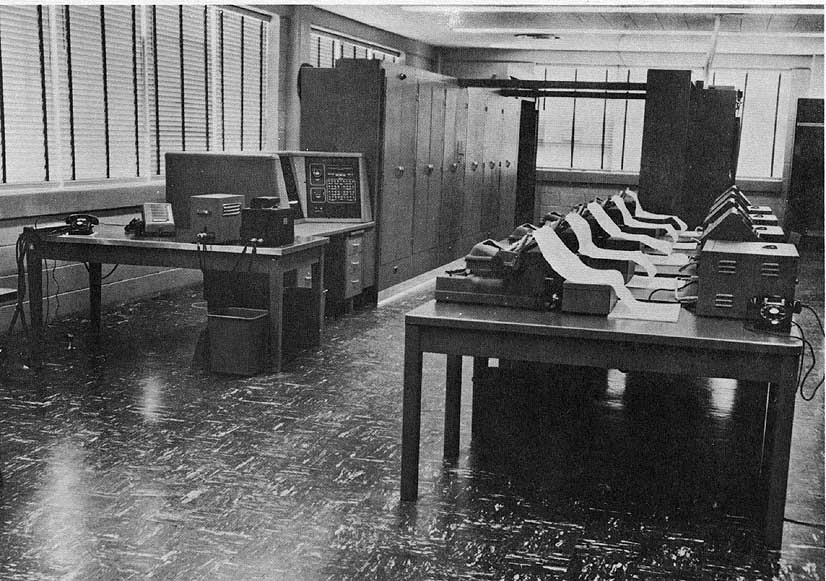
UNIVAC 1102

The UNIVAC 1102 or ERA 1102 was designed by Engineering Research Associates for the United States Air Force's Arnold Engineering Development Center in Tullahoma, Tennessee in response to a request for proposal issued in 1950 and awarded to ERA in October of 1952. The Air Force needed three computers to do data reduction for two wind tunnels and an engine test facility.

The 1102 was a variant of the UNIVAC 1101, using its 24-bit word and a smaller (only 8,192 words) drum memory. The machine had 2,700 vacuum tubes, weighed 14,000 pounds (7.0 short tons; 6.4 t), and occupied 122 square feet (11.3 m^{2}) of floor area.

The computers were connected to data channels coming from the wind tunnels and the engine facility. There were five typewriters for printed output, five paper tape punches, and four pen plotters to produce graphs.

The three computers and related peripherals were delivered between July 1954 and July 1956 at a total price of $1,400,000. Software for the computers was developed entirely at the Arnold Engineering Development center. All programming was done in machine code (assemblers and compilers were never developed).

== See also ==
- List of UNIVAC products
- History of computing hardware
- List of vacuum-tube computers
