= Univac Text Editor =

Text editor software

ED or ED-1100 is an interactive text editor implemented on the UNIVAC 1100/2200 series.

"ED was developed at Univac in the mid-60s. It was loosely based on the Project MAC editor developed for the MULTICS system at MIT."-Tom McCarthy

"Project MAC editor was programmed by Jerry Saltzer as a way to produce documentation. In fact, that editor became the first interactive word-processor ever programmed."

"The command TYPSET is used to create and edit 12-bit BCD line-marked files"

ED was improved by Dr. Roger M. Firestone in the mid-1970s.

== See also ==
- List of UNIVAC products
- History of computing hardware
