= UNIVAC 418 =

Line of three computers designed in the 1960s

The UNIVAC 418 is a transistorized computer that made by Sperry Univac. It has 18-bit words and uses magnetic-core memory. The name came from its 4-microsecond memory cycle time and 18-bit word. The assembly language for this class of computers is TRIM III and ART418.

Over the three different models, more than 392 systems were manufactured. It evolved from the Control Unit Tester (CUT), a device used in the factory to test peripherals for larger systems.

== Architecture ==
The instruction word has three formats:

Format I - common Load, Store, and Arithmetic operations

- f - Function code (6 bits)
- u - Operand address (12 bits)

Format II - Constant arithmetic and Boolean functions

- f - Function code (6 bits)
- z - Operand address or value (12 bits)

Format III - Input/Output

- f - Function code (6 bits)
- m - Minor function code (6 bits)
- k - Designator (6 bits) used for channel number, shift count, etc.

Numbers are represented in ones' complement, single and double precision. The TRIM assembly source code used octal numbers, as was common practice at the time for machines with word lengths evenly divisible by 3, but not by 4.

The machine has the following addressable registers:

- A - Register (Double precision Accumulator, 36 bits) composed of:
  - AU - Register (Upper Accumulator, 18 bits)
  - AL - Register (Lower Accumulator, 18 bits)
- ICR - Register (Index Control Register, 3 bits), also designated the "B-register"
- SR - Register ("Special Register", 4 bits), a paging register allowing direct access to memory banks other than the executing (P register) bank
- P - Register (Program address, 15 bits)

All register values were displayed in real time on the front panel of the computer in binary, with the ability of the user to enter new values via push button (a function that was safe to perform only when the computer was not in run mode).

== UNIVAC 418-I ==
The first UNIVAC 418-I was delivered in June 1963. It was available with 4,096 to 16,384 words of memory.

=== UNIVAC 1218 Military Computer ===
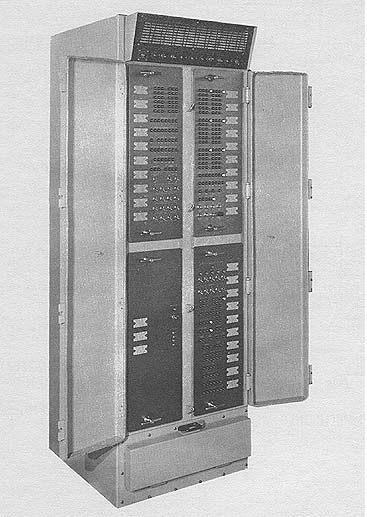
UNIVAC 1218 Military Computer

The 418-I was also available in a version for the military known as the UNIVAC 1218. It was almost 6 feet tall and weighed 775 pounds (352 kg). It required both 115VAC, one-phase, 60 Hz and 115VAC, three-phase, 400 Hz power.

Basic system/component	Purchase price
Minimum 1218 computer: 4,096 word memory, 4 I/0	$96,000
Most common 1218 computer: 16,384 word memory, 8 I/0	$127,000
Militarized magnetic tape system (2 handlers)	80,500
Paper tape subsystem including keyboard and printer	25,000
High speed printer system	77,500
80 column card system	83,250
	——————
Grand total minimum 1218 computer system	$362,250
Grand total most common 1218 computer system	$393,250

== UNIVAC 418-II ==
The first UNIVAC 418-II was delivered in November 1964. It was available with 4,096 to 65,536 (18-bit) words of memory. Memory cycle time was reduced to 2 microseconds. The version for the military was called the UNIVAC 1219 (known as the "Mk 152 Fire Control Computer.") It was part of the Navy's Mk 76 missile fire control system, used to control the AN/SPG-55 radar system.

== UNIVAC 418-III ==
The first UNIVAC 418-III was delivered in 1969. It was available with 32,768 to 131,072 words of memory. Memory cycle time was reduced to 750 nanoseconds. New instructions were added for floating-point arithmetic, binary-to-decimal and decimal-to-binary conversions, and block transfers up to 64 words. The SR register was expanded to six bits. The 418-III had two unique hardware features which enabled it to handle continuously high-speed serial character streams. One was called the buffer overflow interrupt and the other hardware buffer chaining. By the 1990s, all of the 418 hardware was gone, but the California Department of Water Resources was still running 418 emulation on a UNIVAC 1100/60. Customers included the London Hospital in Whitechapel, London, which installed its UNIVAC 418-III in 1973.
