= UNIVAC =

Series of mainframe computer models

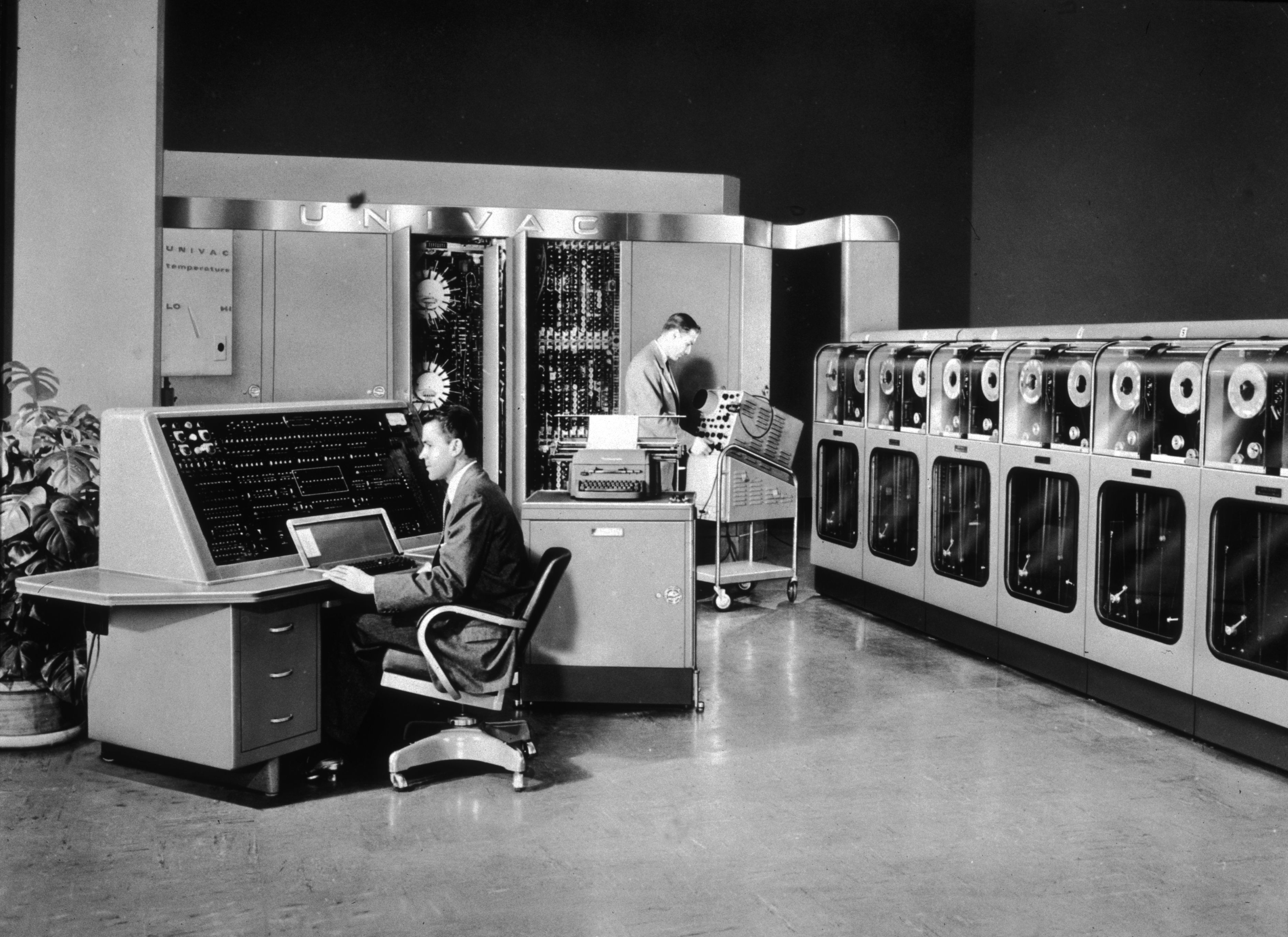
- The UNIVAC I in use at the United States Census Bureau in 1951
- Also known as: Universal Automatic Computer
- Manufacturer: Laboratory for Advanced Research, Remington Rand (1946–1955); Eckert–Mauchly Division (as part of Remington Rand) (1951–1955); ERA Division (as part of Remington Rand) (1952–1955); Sperry Rand (1955–1978); Sperry Corporation (1978–1986)
- Released: March 1951; 75 years ago
- Discontinued: 1986
- Predecessor: ENIAC
- Successor: Unisys 2200 series

UNIVAC (Universal Automatic Computer) was a line of electronic digital stored-program computers starting with the products of the Eckert–Mauchly Computer Corporation. After capturing the public imagination with the use of the UNIVAC I during the 1952 US Presidential election, it was decided to extend the branding to all machines made by the other computing divisions of the Remington Rand company (Engineering Research Associates and the Norwalk Laboratory of Remington Rand).

After the merger of Remington Rand with the Sperry Corporation (under name of Sperry Rand) in 1955, it was decided to merge all three divisions along with Remington Rand's tabulator division into one unified organization under the name of the Univac division. This name persisted until the mid-1980s when it was renamed to the Sperry Computer Systems Division; the last UNIVAC-badged system was the UNIVAC 1100/90, which was announced in 1982 and first shipped in late 1983.

== History and structure ==
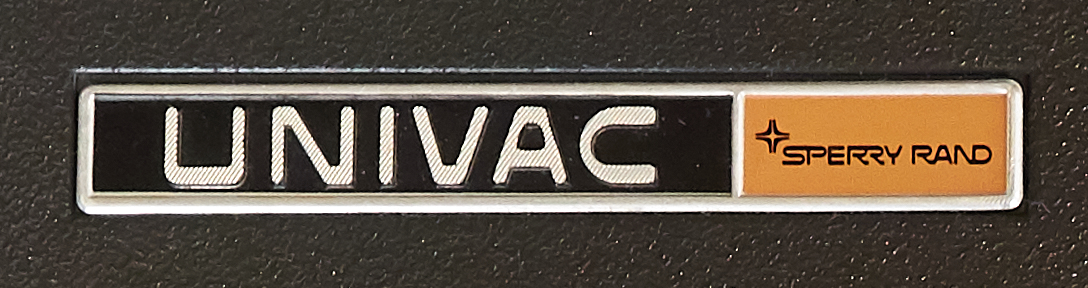
UNIVAC Sperry Rand label

J. Presper Eckert and John Mauchly built the ENIAC (Electronic Numerical Integrator and Computer) at the University of Pennsylvania's Moore School of Electrical Engineering between 1943 and 1946. A 1946 patent rights dispute with the university led Eckert and Mauchly to depart the Moore School to form the Electronic Control Company, later renamed Eckert–Mauchly Computer Corporation (EMCC), based in Philadelphia, Pennsylvania. That company first built a computer called BINAC (BINary Automatic Computer) for Northrop Aviation (which was little used, or perhaps not at all). Afterwards, the development of UNIVAC began in April 1946. UNIVAC was first intended for the Bureau of the Census, which paid for much of the development, and then was put in production.

With the death of EMCC's chairman and chief financial backer Henry L. Straus in a plane crash on October 25, 1949, EMCC was sold to typewriter, office machine, electric razor, and gun maker Remington Rand on February 15, 1950. Eckert and Mauchly now reported to Leslie Groves, the retired army general who had previously managed building The Pentagon and led the Manhattan Project.

The most famous UNIVAC product was the UNIVAC I mainframe computer of 1951, which became known for predicting the outcome of the 1952 United States presidential election: this incident is noteworthy because the computer correctly predicted an Eisenhower landslide over Adlai Stevenson, whereas the final Gallup poll had Eisenhower winning the popular vote 51–49 in a close contest.

The prediction led CBS's news boss in New York, Siegfried Mickelson, to believe the computer was in error, and he refused to allow the prediction to be read. Instead, the crew showed some staged theatrics that suggested the computer was not responsive, and announced it was predicting 8–7 odds for an Eisenhower win (the actual prediction was 100–1 in his favor).

When the predictions proved true—Eisenhower defeated Stevenson in a landslide, with UNIVAC coming within 3.5% of his popular vote total and four votes of his Electoral College total—Charles Collingwood, the on-air announcer, announced that they had failed to believe the earlier prediction.

The United States Army requested a UNIVAC computer from Congress in 1951. Colonel Wade Heavey explained to the Senate subcommittee that the national mobilization planning involved multiple industries and agencies: "This is a tremendous calculating process...there are equations that can not be solved by hand or by electrically operated computing machines because they involve millions of relationships that would take a lifetime to figure out." Heavey told the subcommittee it was needed to help with mobilization and other issues similar to the invasion of Normandy that were based on the relationships of various groups.

The UNIVAC was manufactured at Remington Rand's former Eckert-Mauchly Division plant on W Allegheny Avenue in Philadelphia, Pennsylvania. Remington Rand also had an engineering research lab in Norwalk, Connecticut, and later bought Engineering Research Associates (ERA) in St. Paul, Minnesota. In 1953 or 1954 Remington Rand merged their Norwalk tabulating machine division, the ERA "scientific" computer division, and the UNIVAC "business" computer division into a single division under the UNIVAC name. This severely annoyed those who had been with ERA and with the Norwalk laboratory.

In 1955 Remington Rand merged with Sperry Corporation to become Sperry Rand. General Douglas MacArthur, then the chairman of the Board of Directors of Remington Rand, was chosen to continue in that role in the new company. Harry Franklin Vickers, then the President of Sperry Corporation, continued as president and CEO of Sperry Rand. The UNIVAC division of Remington Rand was renamed the Remington Rand Univac division of Sperry Rand. William Norris was put in charge as Vice-President and General Manager reporting to the President of the Remington Rand Division (of Sperry Rand).

The following is a list of the General Managers/Presidents of the Division. There was some degree of internal organisation turmoil from the period of the creation of Sperry Rand in 1955 right into the early 1960s. This culminated in the resignation of William Norris in 1957 and would continue until the early 1960s with the decentralisation of the former Remington Group and the promotion of UNIVAC to a full division of Sperry Rand.

| # | Name | Years in office | Title |
|---|---|---|---|
| 1 | William Norris | 1955-1957 | Vice-President & General Manager UNIVAC Division |
| 2 | Thornton C. Fry | 1957-1959 | Vice-President & General Manager UNIVAC Division |
| 3 | Jay W. Schnackel | 1959-1962 | Vice-President & General Manager UNIVAC Division |
| 4 | Dr. Louis T. Rader | 1962-1964 | President of the UNIVAC Division |
| 5 | J. Frank Forster | 1964-1966 | President of the UNIVAC Division |
| 6 | Robert E. McDonald | 1966-1971 | President of the UNIVAC Division |
| 7 | Gerald G. Probst | 1971–1978 | President of the UNIVAC Division |
| 8 | Richard l. Gehring | 1978-1981 | President of the UNIVAC Division |
| 9 | Joseph J. Kroger | 1981-1985 | President of the UNIVAC / Sperry Computer Systems Division. |

In the 1960s, UNIVAC was one of the eight major American computer companies in an industry then referred to as "IBM and the seven dwarfs" – IBM being by far the largest, trailed by Burroughs, Univac, NCR, CDC, GE, RCA, and Honeywell. After GE sold its computer business to Honeywell and RCA sold its to Univac, the play on Snow White and the Seven Dwarfs was changed to the remaining small firms being known as the "BUNCH" (Burroughs, Univac, NCR, Control Data, and Honeywell).

During the 1960s Univac was involved in work on automating Air Traffic Control, the first trial system of the "Automated Radar Terminal System" (ARTS-I) was installed in Atlanta, followed by ARTS-IA system in New York, both of these systems were built around a UNIVAC 418 minicomputer. In 1969 the Federal Aviation Administration awarded a fixed-price multi-year contract to Univac Federal Systems Division for the installation of 64 ARTS III systems. Each installation consisted of three subsystems, namely the Data acquisition subsystem, the Data processing subsystem and the Data Entry and display subsystem. Burroughs Corporation received the subcontract for the Data acquisition subsystem, while the Data Entry and Display subsystem was subcontracted to Texas Instruments. The Data processing system was built around the 30-bit Univac 8303 IOP (I/O Processor) which could be configured in a multiprocessor configuration, depending on the specific Air traffic control site (New York had the largest) These systems would continue in service well into the 1990s.

In 1977, Sperry Rand purchased Varian Data Machines so as to enter the minicomputer market. Varian would be renamed as the Sperry UNIVAC Minicomputer Operation, operating as part of the Sperry UNIVAC division. Sperry UNIVAC would continue to market the V77 but never made a significant dent in the minicomputer market.

To assist "corporate identity" the name was changed to Sperry Univac, along with Sperry Remington, Sperry New Holland, etc. In 1978, Sperry Rand, a conglomerate of various divisions (computers, typewriters, office furniture, hay balers, manure spreaders, gyroscopes, avionics, radar, electric razors), decided to concentrate solely on its computing interests and all of the unrelated divisions were sold. The company dropped the Rand from its title and reverted to Sperry Corporation. By 1981 Sperry Univac was the largest of Sperry's operating divisions, in that year it brought in revenues of $2.7 billion. Subsequently the distinct Sperry UNIVAC branding was dropped and the division was renamed as the Sperry Computer Systems Division. In 1986, Sperry Corporation merged with Burroughs Corporation to become Unisys.

After the 1986 merger of Burroughs and Sperry, Unisys evolved from a computer manufacturer to a computer services and outsourcing firm, competing at that time in the same marketplace as IBM, Electronic Data Systems (EDS), and Computer Sciences Corporation.

As of 2021, Unisys continues to design and manufacture enterprise class computers with the ClearPath server lines.

== Models ==
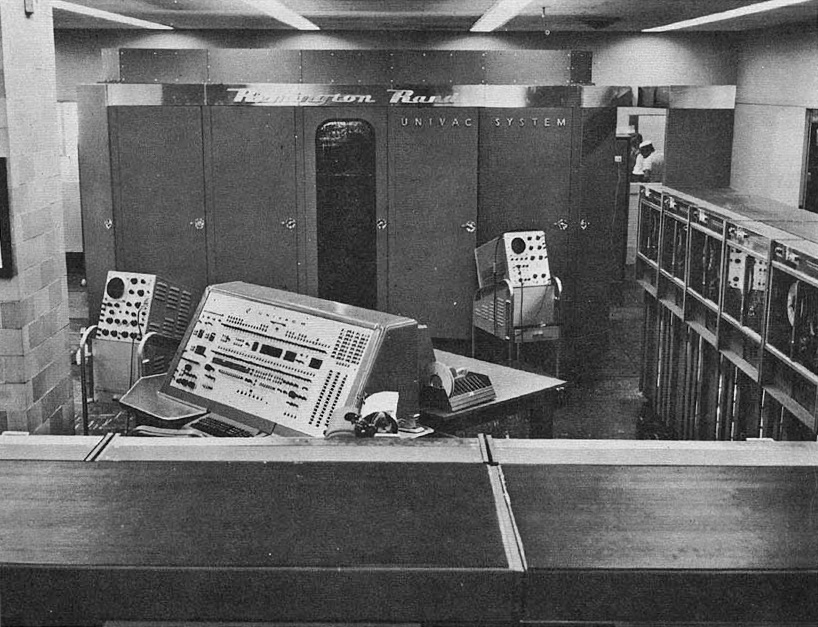
UNIVAC II

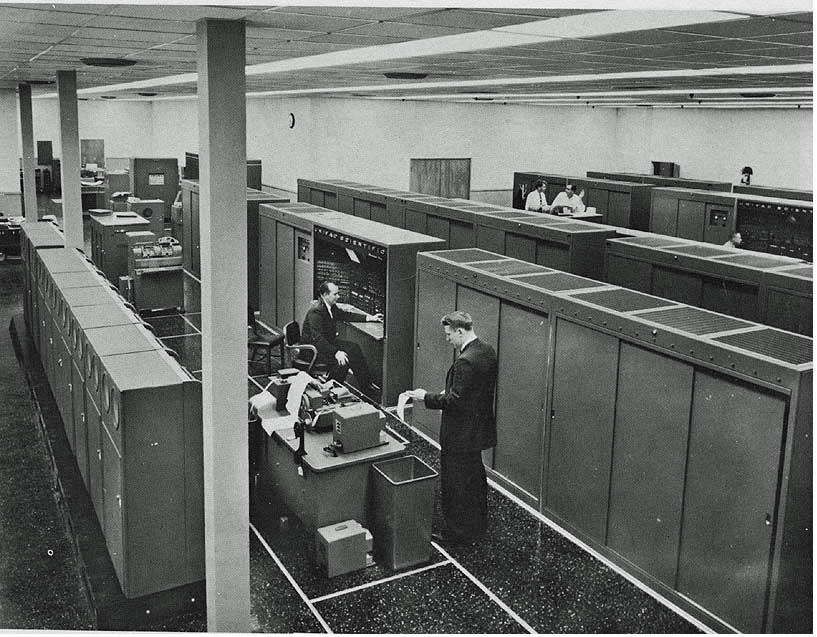
UNIVAC 1103

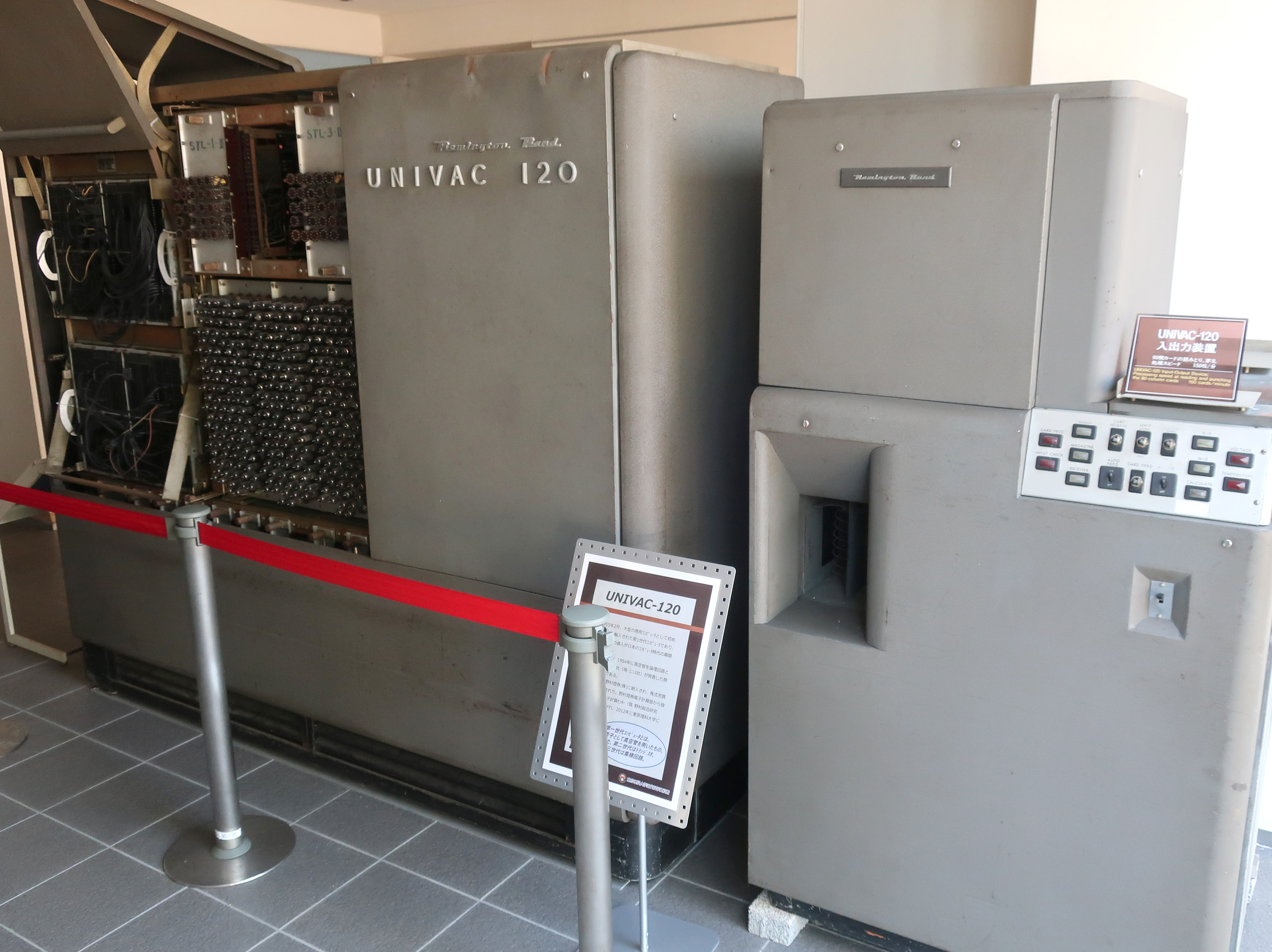
UNIVAC 120 (Remington Rand 409)

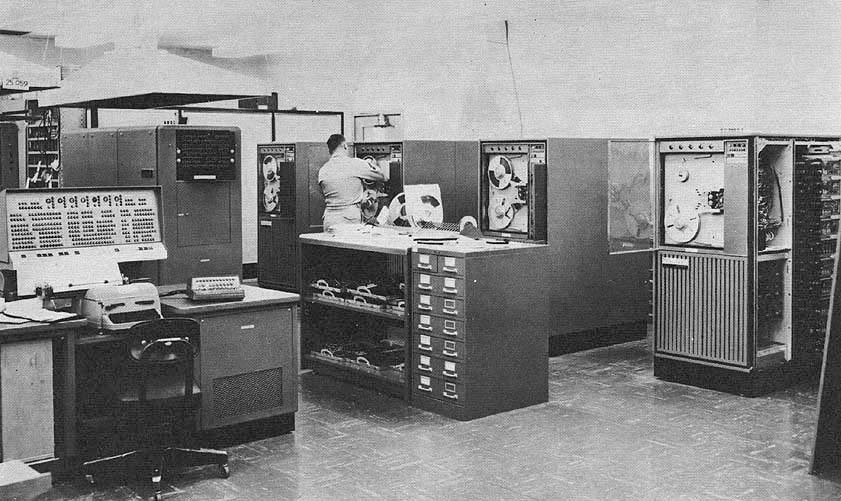
UNIVAC File Computer

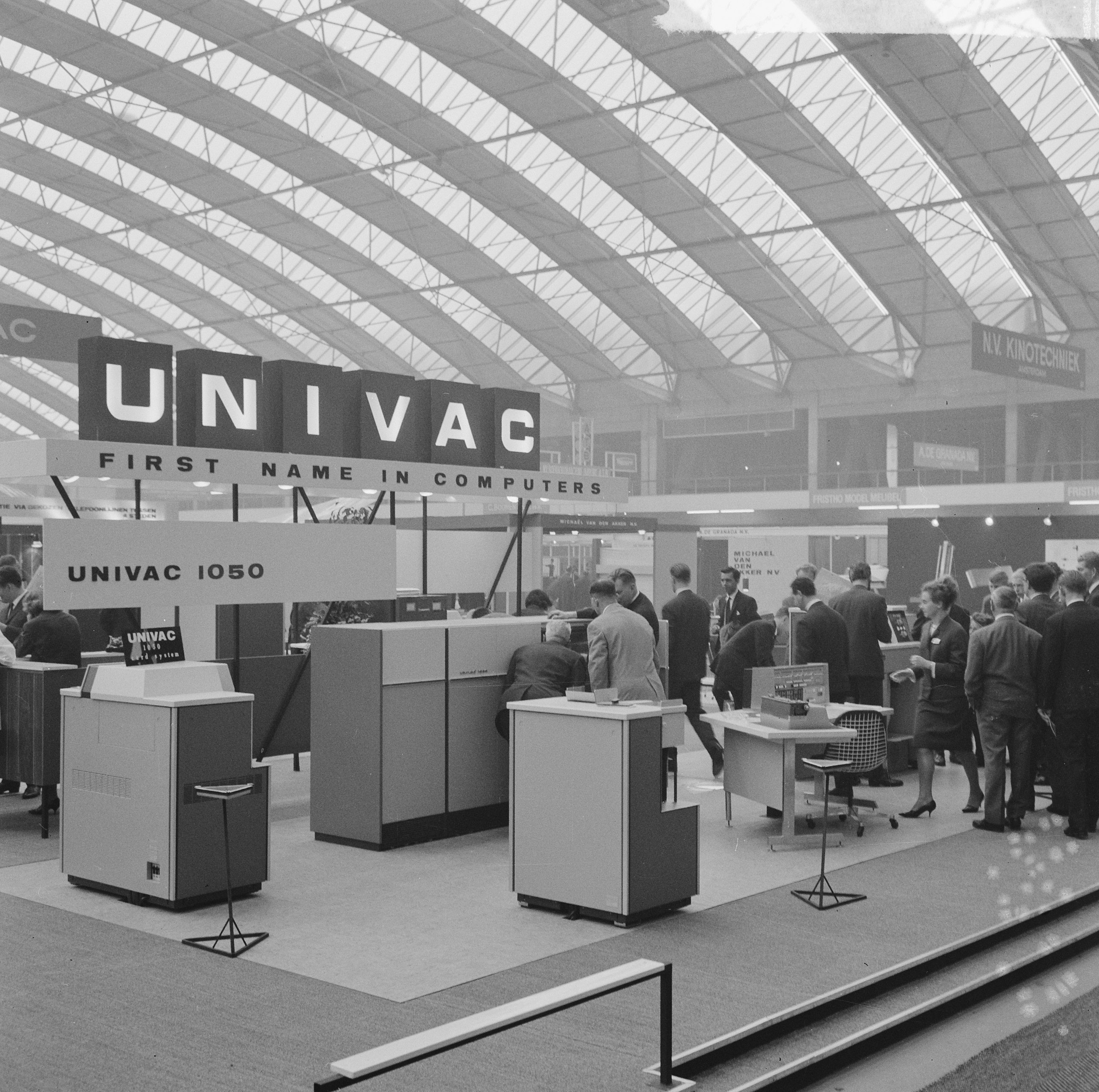
UNIVAC 1050

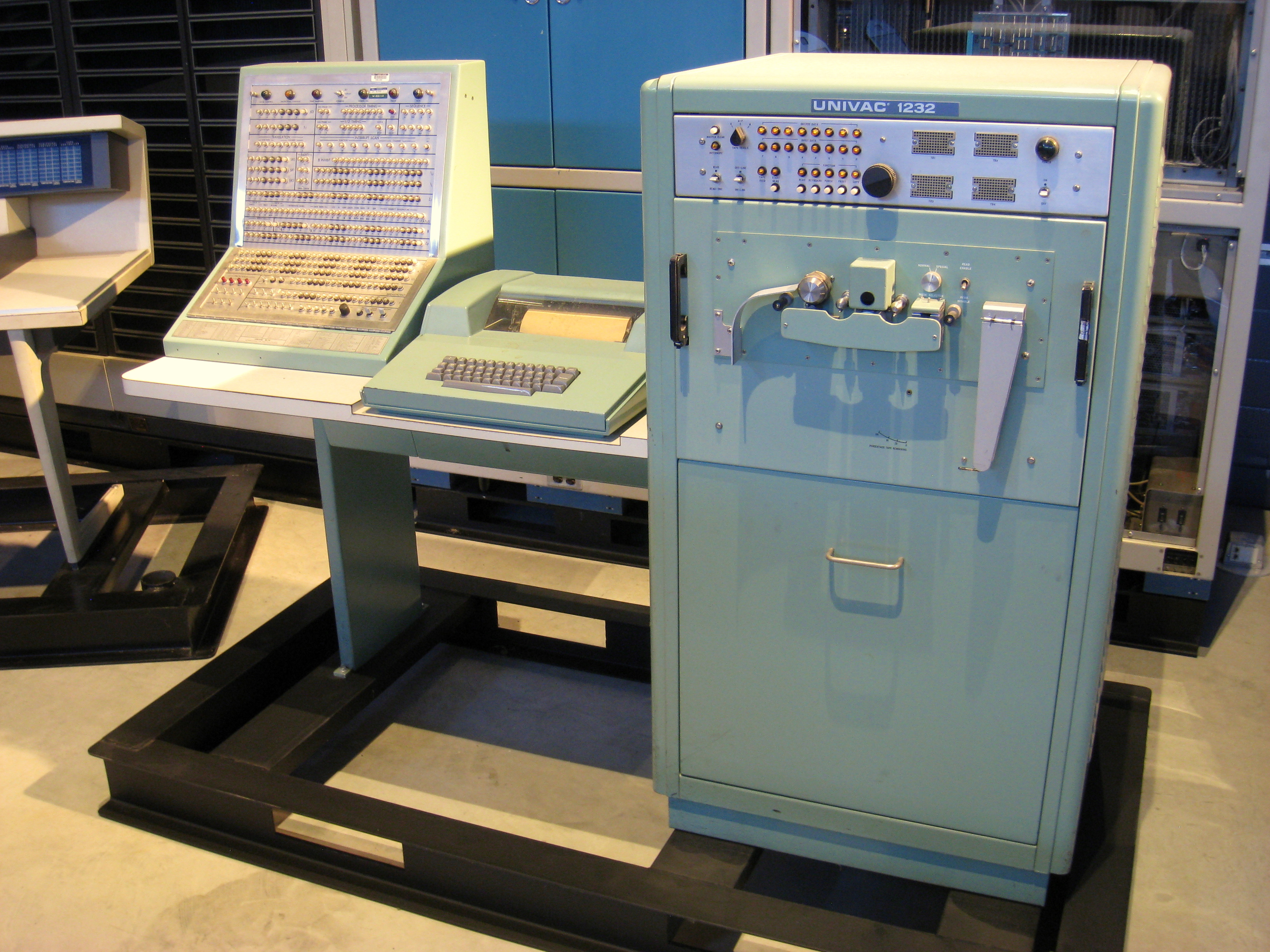
UNIVAC 1232

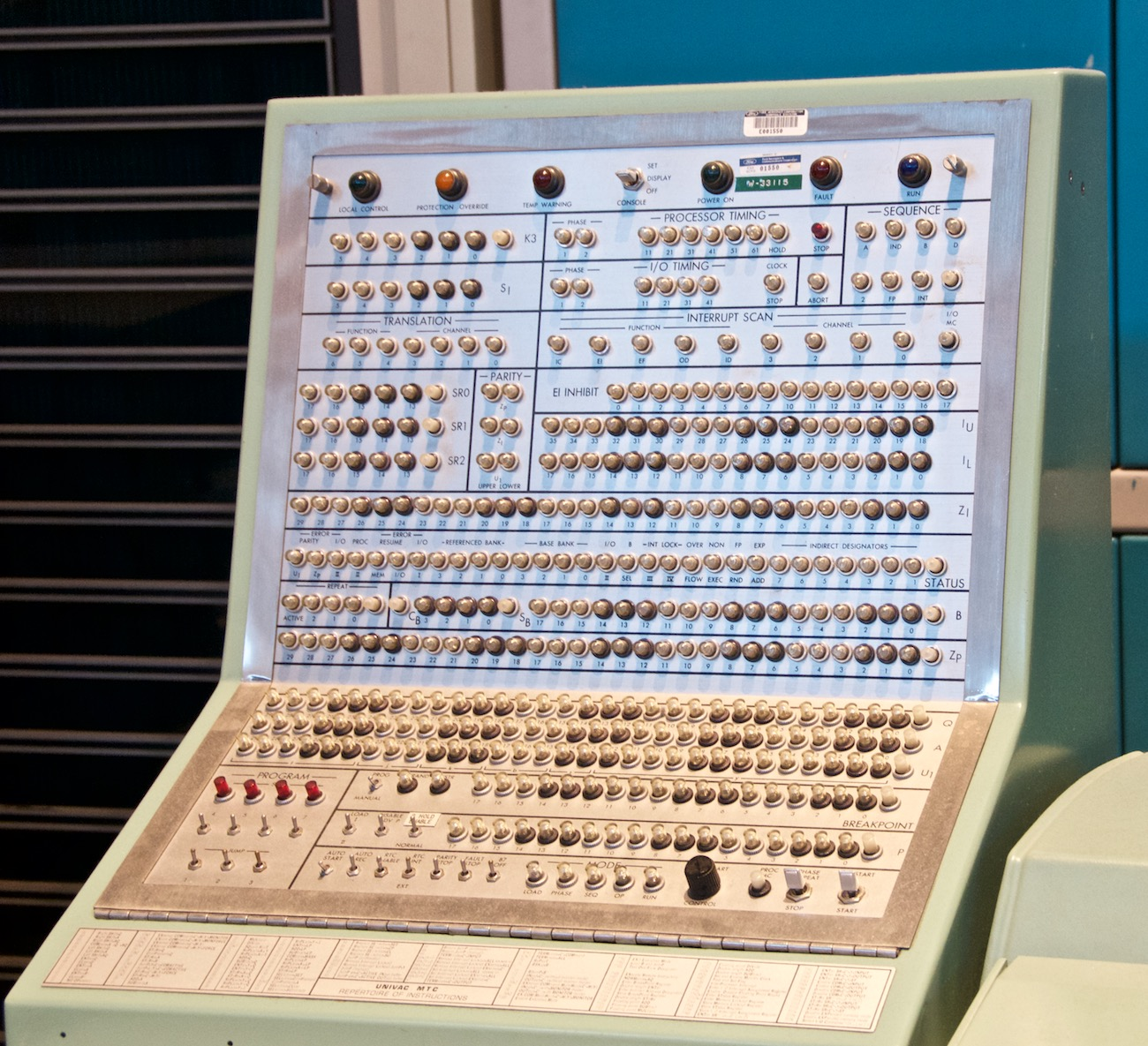
Control panel for UNIVAC 1232

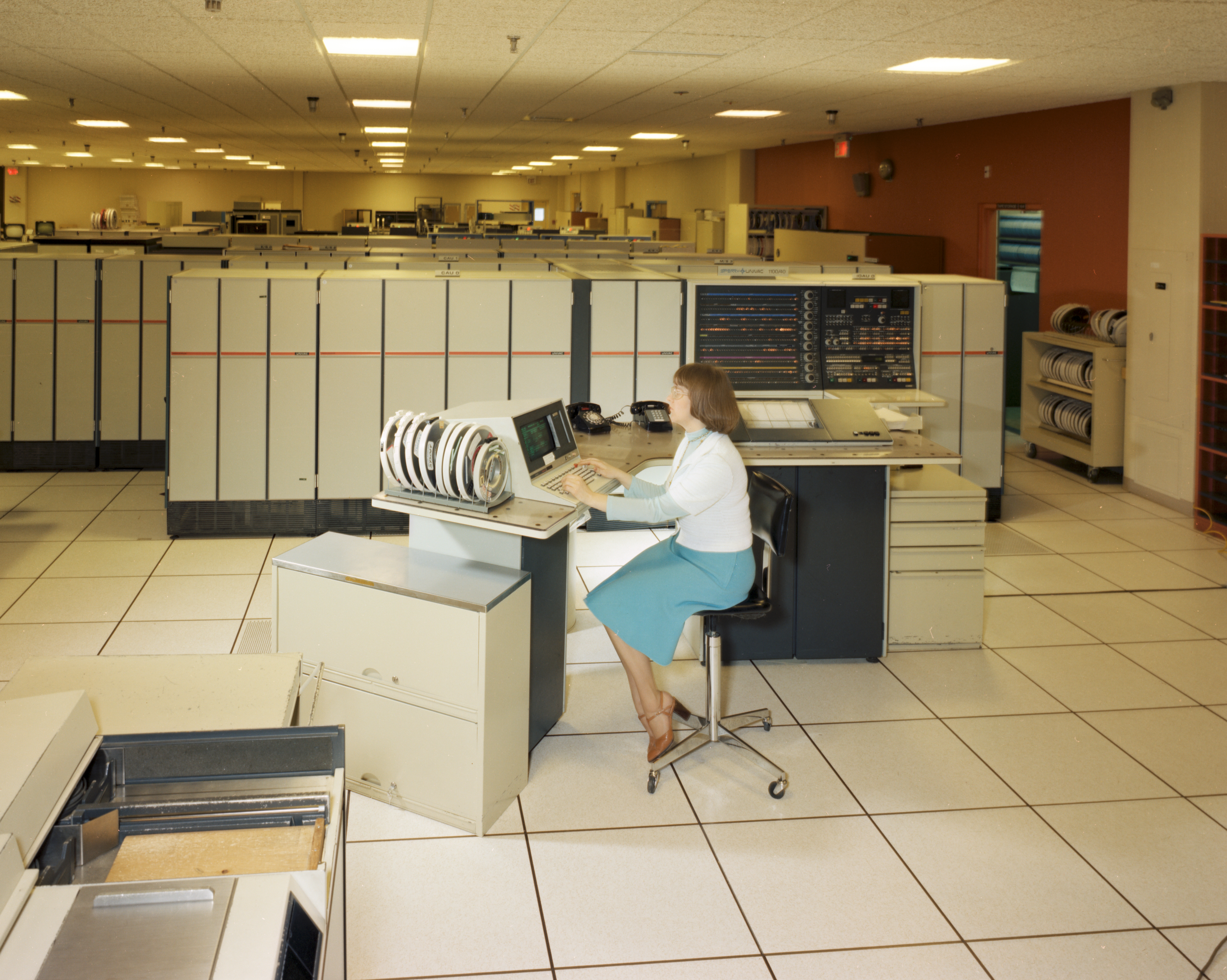
UNIVAC 1100/40

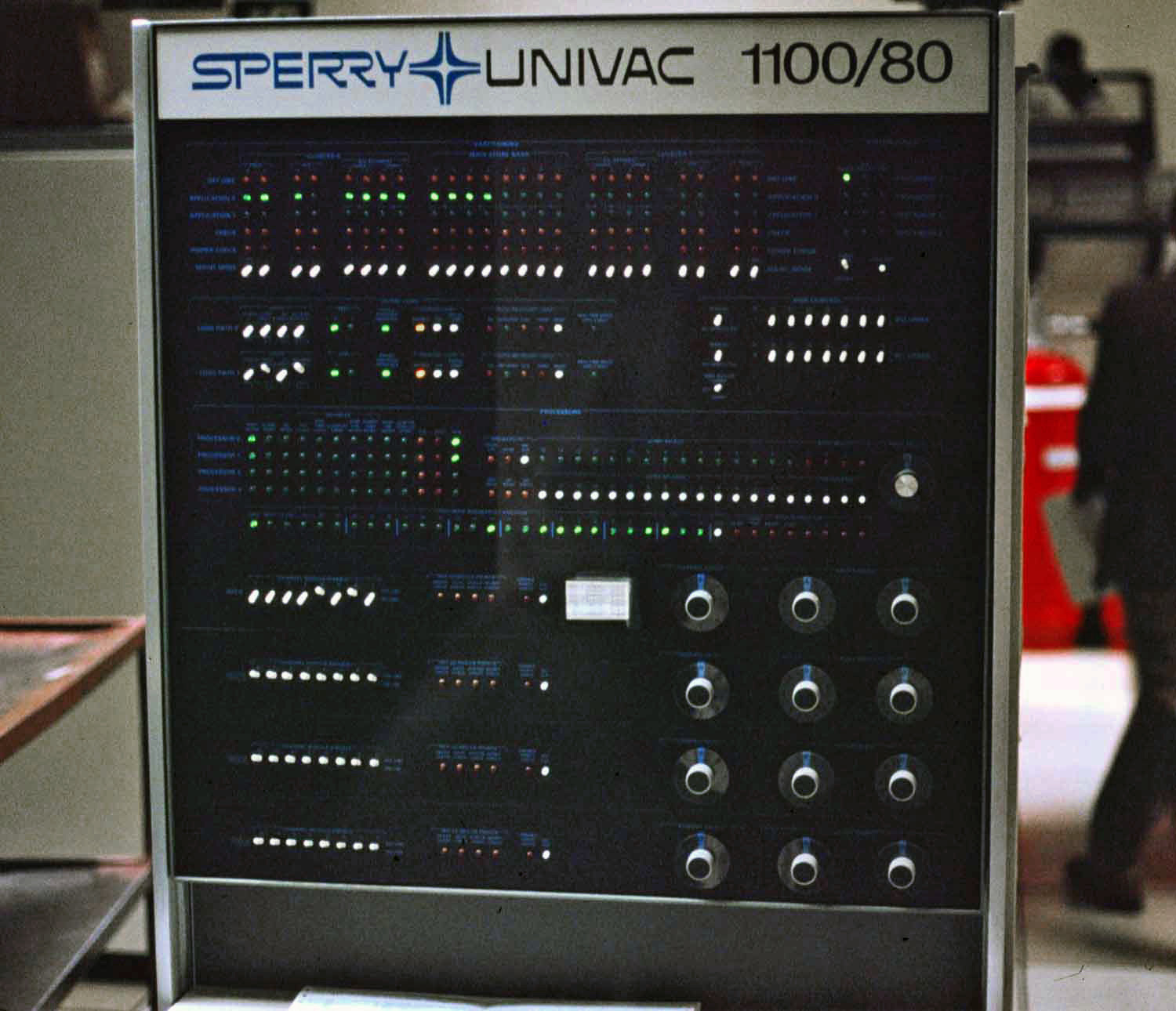
UNIVAC 1100/80

UNIVAC 1108

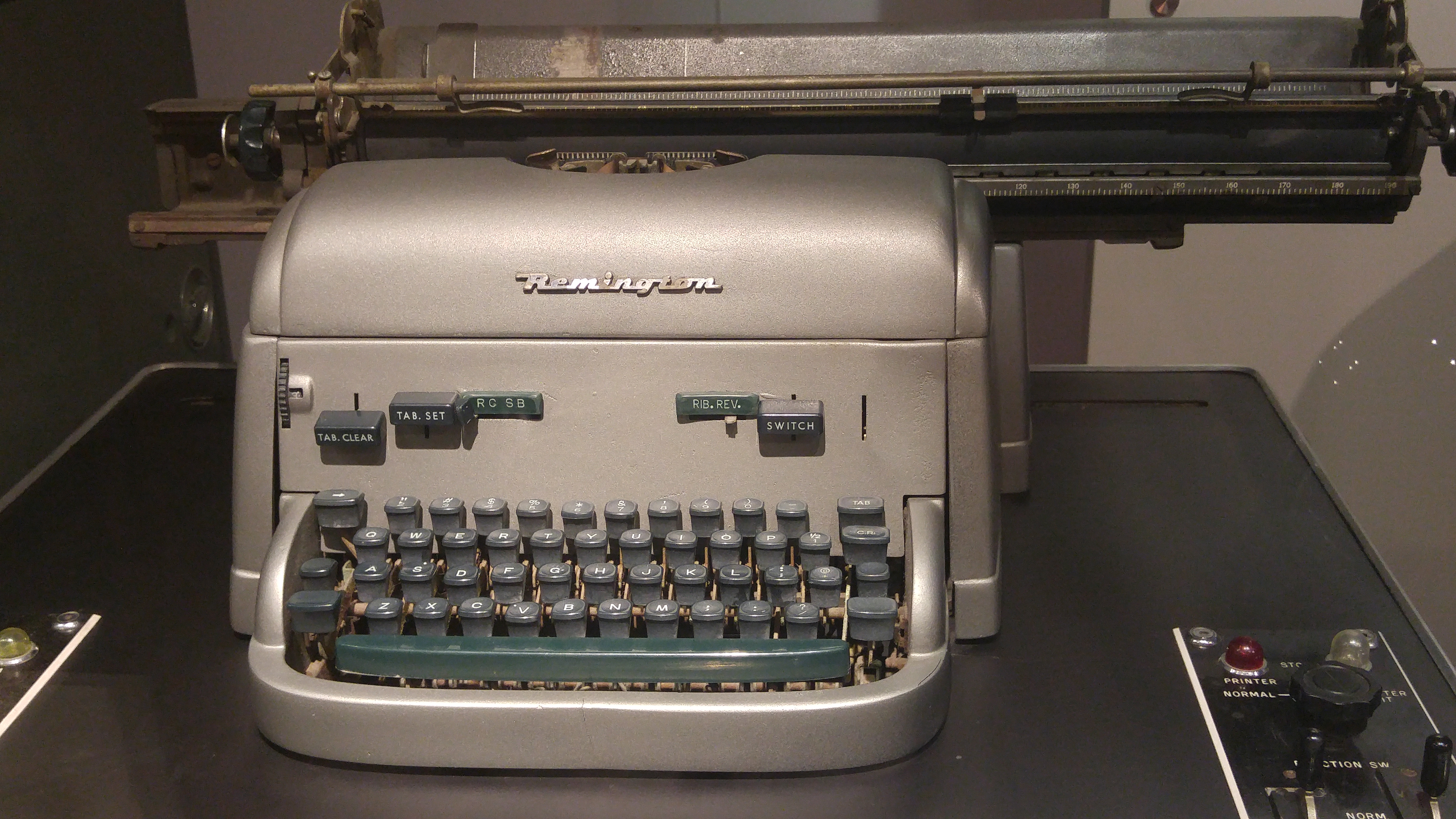
UNIVAC Console Printer

In the course of its history, UNIVAC produced a number of separate model ranges. One early UNIVAC line of vacuum tube computers was based on the ERA 1101 and those models built at ERA were rebadged as UNIVAC 110x; despite the 1100 model numbers, they were not related to the latter 1100/2200 series. The 1103A is credited in the literature as the first computer to have interrupts.

The original model range was the UNIVAC I (UNIVersal Automatic Computer I), the second commercial computer made in the United States. (Note: BINAC, mentioned above, was the first.) The main memory consisted of tanks of liquid mercury implementing delay-line memory, arranged in 1,000 words of 12 alphanumeric characters each. The first machine was delivered on 31 March 1951.

The Remington Rand 409 was a control panel programmed punched card calculator, designed in 1949, and sold in two models: the UNIVAC 60 (1952) and the UNIVAC 120 (1953).

The UNIVAC File Computer was first shipped in 1956. It was equipped with between one and ten large drums each holding 180,000 Alphanumeric characters. One early application was for an airline reservations system, which was used by Eastern Air Lines. It competed mainly against the IBM 650 and the IBM 305 RAMAC and a total of 130 were manufactured.

The UNIVAC II was an improvement to the UNIVAC I that UNIVAC first delivered in 1958. The improvements included magnetic (non-mercury) core memory of 2,000 to 10,000 words, UNISERVO II tape drives, which could use either the old UNIVAC I metal tapes or the new PET film tapes, and some circuits that were transistorized (although it was still a vacuum-tube computer). It was fully compatible with existing UNIVAC I programs for both code and data. The UNIVAC II also added some instructions to the UNIVAC I's instruction set.

The UNIVAC Solid State was a 2-address, decimal computer, with memory on a rotating drum with 5,000 signed 10-digit words, aimed at the general-purpose business market. It came in two versions: the Solid State 80 (IBM-Hollerith 80-column cards) and the Solid State 90 (Remington-Rand 90-column cards). This computer used magnetic logic, not transistors, because the transistors then available had highly variable characteristics and were not sufficiently reliable. Magnetic logic gates were based on magnetic cores with multiple wire windings; unlike vacuum tubes, they were solid-state devices and had a virtually infinite lifetime. The magnetic gates required drive pulses of current produced by a transmitter-type vacuum tube, of a type still used in amateur radio final amplifiers. Thus the Solid State depended, at the heart of its operations, on a vacuum tube, however, only a few tubes were required, instead of thousands, greatly increasing reliability.

Sperry Rand began shipment of UNIVAC III in 1962, and produced 96 UNIVAC III systems. Unlike the UNIVAC I and UNIVAC II, it was a binary machine as well as maintaining support for all UNIVAC I and UNIVAC II decimal and alphanumeric data formats for backward compatibility. This was the last of the original UNIVAC machines.

The UNIVAC 418 (aka 1219), first shipped in 1962, was an 18-bit word core memory machine. Over the three different models, more than 392 systems were manufactured.

The UNIVAC 490 was a 30-bit word core memory machine with 16K or 32K words; 4.8 microsecond cycle time. The UNIVAC 1232 was a military version of the 490.

The UNIVAC 492 is similar to the UNIVAC 490, but with extended memory to 64K 30-bit words.

The UNIVAC 494 was a 30-bit word machine and successor to the UNIVAC 490/492 with faster CPU and 131K (later 262K) core memory. Up to 24 I/O channels were available and the system was usually shipped with UNIVAC FH880 or UNIVAC FH432 or FH1782 magnetic drum storage. Basic operating system was OMEGA (successor to REX for the 490) although custom operating systems were also used (e.g. CONTORTS for airline reservations).

The UNIVAC 1050 was an internally programmed computer with up to 32K of six-bit character memory, which was introduced in 1963. It was a one-address machine with 30-bit instructions, had a 4K operating system and was programmed in the PAL assembly language. The 1050 was used extensively by the U.S. Air Force supply system for inventory control (The Standard Base Level Supply System).

The UNIVAC 1004 was a plug-board programmed punched-card data processing system, introduced in 1962 by UNIVAC. Total memory was 961 characters (6 bits per character) of core memory. Peripherals were a card reader (400 cards/minute), a card punch (200 cards/minute) using proprietary 90-column, round-hole cards or IBM-compatible, 80-column cards, a drum printer (400 lines/minute) and a Uniservo tape drive. The 1004 was also supported as a remote card reader & printer via synchronous communication services. A U.S. Navy (Weapons Station, Concord) 1004 was dedicated to printing from tape as a means of offloading the task from their Solid State 80 mainframe, which produced the tapes. A design for an "Emulator" board was available that would allow the plugboard 1004 to run programs read from card decks. The board was made by the customers, not by UNIVAC. However, the Emulator made heavy use of the 1004's program-branching reed relays, called selectors, which caused increased failures, later solved by the use of electronic selectors in the follow-on 1005.

The UNIVAC 1005, an enhanced version of the UNIVAC 1004, was first shipped in February 1966. The machine saw extensive use by the US Army, including the first use of an electronic computer on the battlefield. Additional peripherals were also available including a paper tape reader and a three pocket stacker selectable card read/punch. The machine had a two-stage assembler (SAAL – Single Address Assembly Language) which was its primary assembler; it also had a three-stage card based compiler for a programming language called SARGE. 1005s were used as some nodes on Autodin. There were actually two versions of the 1005. The Federal Systems (military) version described above and a Commercial Systems version for civilian use. While the two versions shared common memory and peripherals they had two completely different instruction sets. The Commercial Systems version had a three pass assembler and a program generator.

The UNIVAC 1100/2200 series is a series of compatible 36-bit transistorized computer systems initially made by Sperry Rand. The first true member of the series was the 1107, also known as the Thin-Film Computer due to its use of Thin-film memory for its Control Memory store (128 registers). Delivery of the 1107 was late and this affected sales; the subsequent 1108 was considerably more successful, and helped to establish the series as viable competitors to the IBM System/360. The series continues to be supported today by Unisys Corporation as the ClearPath Forward Dorado Series.

The UNIVAC 9000 series (9200, 9300, 9400, 9700) was introduced in the mid-1960s to compete with the low end of the IBM 360 series. The 9200 and 9300, which differed in CPU speed and maximum memory capacity (16K for the original 9200 vs 32K for the other variants) implemented the same 16-bit modified subset of the 360 architecture as the Model 20, while the UNIVAC 9400 implemented a subset of the full 360 instruction set. This did not violate IBM patents or copyrights; Sperry gained the right to "clone" the 360 as settlement of a lawsuit concerning IBM's infringement of Remington Rand's core memory patents. The 9400 was roughly equivalent to the IBM 360/30. The 9000 series used plated-wire memory, which functioned somewhat like core memory but used a non-destructive read. Since the 9000 series was intended as direct competitors to IBM, they used 80-column cards and EBCDIC character encoding. Memory capacity started as low as 8K byte primary storage for a batch-configured system. Optionally a disk drive subsystem could be added, with 8414 5 MB disk drives as well as tape drives, using the Uniservo VI.

The UNIVAC Series 90:

- High-end: (90/60, 90/70, 90/80): The high-end Series 90 machines were successors to the high-end UNIVAC 9000 machines, but added virtual memory and thus were similar, or equivalent, to later IBM System/370 mainframes.
- Low-end: (90/30, 90/25, 90/40): Separately from the high-end series, Sperry Univac introduced the Univac 90/30 in about 1975 to provide an upgrade path for 9x00 users and to compete with IBM's System 3. It used a disk operating system and had either a 300 or 600 lines per minute printer, a card reader, optionally a card punch, a console (Uniscope 100), attached disk drives that had removable disk packs, several 1,600 or 6,250 bpi tape drives, and an optional communications controller supporting up to 16 terminals (later 32) The standard disk drive was the 8416 which held a multi-layer platter removable disk pack that held approximately 29 million bytes. The 8418 drive was an enhanced version that supported both 29 MB and "double-density" 58 MB disk packs. These disk drives operated on the IDA (Integrated Disk Adapter). There was also an optional 8430 drive with a 100 MB capacity that operated on a separate high speed selector channel. Available tape drives were the Uniservo 10 (Mux Channel) and Uniservo 14 (Selector channel). The optional Selector Channel also enabled the use of other high speed devices such as the 1,200 lpm 0776 printer or the 2,000 lpm 0770 printer. The machine had either 4K or 16K memory chips, and typical machines had between 128 and 512 KiB memory. It ran an OS called OS/3, and could run up to 7 jobs at one time, not counting various OS extensions such as the print spooler and telecommunications access (ICAM). It was an upgrade path for users who had outgrown the IBM System/3. It ran Cobol-74, RPG2, Fortran, and Assembler. The instruction set of the 90/xx series was implemented in microcode and was loaded into control storage as part of the boot up process, before loading the operating system.

Shortly after the 90/30 was introduced, Sperry Univac introduced the 90/25 which was the same basic hardware, however had an option for a smaller 80 column card reader and was a bit slower. The machine executed 3 instructions and then a NOP (no op) to slow it down, as nearly every component was identical to the 90/30). Later a 90/40 model was added, with improved performance from a faster clock rate (cycle time of 500 ns vs 600 ns), pre-fetching of the next instruction, and greater maximum main memory capacity (1M vs 512K).

- The Sperry UNIVAC System 80 series: The entire 90/xx series was eventually replaced in 1981 by the System 80, models 4 and 6. More powerful System 80's (models 8, 10 and 20) were introduced in 1984. These were Sperry-badged, IBM/360-like mainframes actually developed and engineered by Mitsubishi in Japan. The final System 80 was the model 7E, released in 1990 by Unisys.

== Operating systems ==
The 1107 was the first 36-bit, word-oriented machine with an architecture close to that which came to be known as that of the "1100 Series." It ran the EXEC I or EXEC II operating system, batch-oriented second-generation operating systems, typical of the early to mid-1960s. The 1108 ran EXEC II or EXEC 8. EXEC 8 allowed simultaneous handling of real-time applications, time-sharing, and background batch work. Transaction Interface Package (TIP), a transaction-processing environment, allowed programs to be written in COBOL whereas similar programs on competing systems were written in assembly language. On later systems, EXEC 8 was renamed OS 1100 and OS 2200, with modern descendants maintaining backwards compatibility. Some more exotic operating systems ran on the 1108 – one of which was RTOS, a more bare-bones system designed to take better advantage of the hardware.

The affordable System 80 series of small mainframes ran the OS/3 operating system which originated on the Univac 90/30 (and later 90/25, and 90/40).

The UNIVAC Series 90 first ran with Univac developed OS/9, which was later replaced by RCA's Virtual Memory Operating System (VMOS). RCA originally called this operating system Time Sharing Operating System (TSOS), running on RCA's Spectra 70 line of virtual memory systems and changed its name to VMOS before the Sperry acquisition of RCA CSD. After VMOS was ported to the 90/60, Univac renamed it VS/9.

== Trademark ==
UNIVAC has been, over the years, a registered trademark of:

- Eckert–Mauchly Computer Corporation
- Remington Rand Corporation
- Sperry Rand Corporation
- Sperry Corporation
- Unisys Corporation

== See also ==
- FASTRAND
- History of computing hardware
- List of UNIVAC products
- FIELDATA
- Unisys
- Multivac
