= UNIVAC 1100/60 =

Mainframe computer by Univac in 1979

The UNIVAC 1100/60, introduced in 1979, continued the venerable UNIVAC 1100 series first introduced in 1962 with the UNIVAC 1107. The 1107 was the first 1100-series machine introduced under the Sperry Corporation name.

Like its predecessors, it had support for multiple CPUs; initially only two, but later up to four. It continued the naming convention introduced with the 1100/10, where the last digit represented the number of CPUs (thus, a four CPU system would be an 1100/64).

The 1100/60 introduced a new feature to the line: the CPUs used microcode that was loaded during the booting process. The booting process was controlled by a microcomputer (called the "SSP" - "System Support Processor") that ran from 8-inch floppy disks. The microcode was stored on these disks.

The system included an optional (extra-cost) set of additions to the instruction set (referred to as the Extended Instruction Set or EIS), which contained features to enhance the execution of COBOL programs, when appropriately compiled.

The UNIVAC 1100/70 shared much of the same architecture, including the same console and microcode.

== See also ==
- List of UNIVAC products
- History of computing hardware
