= UNIVAC Solid State =

Computer announced by UNIVAC in 1958

The UNIVAC Solid State was a magnetic drum-based solid-state computer announced by Sperry Rand in December 1958 as a response to the IBM 650. It was one of the first computers offered for sale to be (nearly) entirely solid-state, using 700 transistors, and 3000 magnetic amplifiers (FERRACTOR) for primary logic, and 20 vacuum tubes largely for power control. It came in two versions, the Solid State 80 (IBM-style 80-column cards) and the Solid State 90 (Remington-Rand 90-column cards). In addition to the "80/90" designation, there were two variants of the Solid State – the SS I 80/90 and the SS II 80/90. The SS II series included two enhancements – the addition of 1,280 words of core memory and support for magnetic tape drives. The SS I had only the standard 5,000-word drum memory described in this article and no tape drives.

The memory drum had a regular access speed AREA and a FAST ACCESS AREA. A bank of 4,000 words of memory had one set of read/write (R/W) heads to access. The programmer was required to keep track of what words of memory where under the R/W heads and available to be read or written. At worst the program would have to wait for a full revolution of the drum to access the required memory locations. However 1,000 words of memory had four sets of R/W heads requiring only at most a 90-degree turn of the drum to access the required words. Programming required that any function that changed the contents of a memory location had first to transfer the contents of the affected word from the drum to a static register. There were three of these registers A X L, to add the values contained in drum memory locations the programmer would transfer the contents of the specific drum location to register A, then the second operand would be copied to the X register. The ADD instruction would be executed leaving the result in the X register. The contents of the X register would then be written back to the appropriate word on the drum.

Both variants included a card reader, a card punch, and the line printer described in this article. The only "console" was a 10-key adding machine-type keypad, from which the operator would enter the commands to boot the computer. That keypad was also used by programmers in the debugging process. There was no operating system as we have come to know them in recent years; every program was completely self-contained, including the boot loader that initiated execution. All programs were loaded from punched cards; even on the SS II, with its tape drives, there was no ability to launch programs from those drives.

The SS II, including two tape drives, weighed about 12,027 pounds (6.0 short tons; 5.5 t).

== Architecture ==
The UNIVAC Solid State was a two-address, bi-quinary coded decimal computer using signed 10-digit words. Main memory storage was provided by a 5000-word magnetic drum spinning at 17,667 RPM in a helium atmosphere. For efficiency, programmers had to take into account drum latency, the time required for a specific data item, once written, to rotate to where it could be read.

== Technology ==
The Solid State was one of the first commercially produced computers to use mostly solid-state components. However, much of the computer's logic was made out of magnetic amplifiers, not transistors. The decision to use magnetic amplifiers was made because the point-contact germanium transistors then available had highly variable characteristics and were not sufficiently reliable. The magnetic amplifiers were based on tiny (about 1/8" ID) toroidal stainless steel spools wound with two or so layers of 1/32" wide 4-79 moly-permalloy magnetic material to form magnetic cores. These cores had two windings of #60 copper wire surrounding the 4-79 molypermalloy.

The magnetic amplifiers required clock pulses of heavy current that could not be produced by the transistors of the day. The system used a clock derived from a timing band recorded on the main storage drum. This signal was read and amplified, processed and sent to the driver tubes, a pair of 6146 power pentode output tubes. The output from these tubes then fed the main clock power amplifier consisting of six 4CX250B metal/ceramic power tetrode tubes running in push-pull/parallel, yielding an output of a kilowatt. The powerful high-voltage signal was stepped down to a 36-volt, high-current clock by oil-filled transformers that were distributed about the machine. The SS80/90 computer could be heard quite clearly in the AM broadcast band at 707 kHz and 1414 kHz. The 4CX250B tetrodes used a grounded plate (anode) due to forced aircooling requirements. This tube is still in demand by amateur radio operators. The clock tube was enclosed in a shielding box that constrained both radio emissions and viewing by eyes of other than Univac's field engineers. The power supply output was -1.6 kV for cathode supply and -800 V screen grid supply at 1.8 A capacity. The supply weighed nearly 100 pounds and was mounted at the very top of the power supply stack. Thus the SS 80/90, for the heart of its operation, depended on the very technology it claimed to replace, a marketing tactic.

== Applications ==
The computer was a follow on to a computer built for the USAF and delivered to Lawrence G. Hanscom Field, near Cambridge, Massachusetts in 1957. It was manufactured in two versions: the Solid State 80 (IBM-Hollerith 80-column cards) and the Solid State 90 (Remington-Rand 90-column cards). This machine was designated the Solid State 80-90 and sold mostly in Europe. The SS80/90 was aimed at the general-purpose business market. UNIVAC SS80/90s were installed at DC Transit, SBA, CWA, in Washington DC during the early sixties.

== Peripherals ==
The line printer ran at 600 lines per minute, using a continuously rotating print drum technology, with letters, figures and punctuation marks distributed around the drum at each column. 132 solenoid-operated flat-faced print hammers comprised a print line, with ten characters to the inch. When a desired character arrived at the printing position, as indicated by timing marks on the end of the drum, a thyratron would fire and energize a print column solenoid, propelling its hammer to the back face of the printing paper. The paper would be bounced against a wide inked ribbon and against the drum, printing the desired character. The hammer would then rebound with a spring to await the next thyratron firing and the process would repeat on the next line down the sheet. Drum printers, when not adjusted properly, or due to component wear would mis-register the character vertically.

The card punch had a maximum rate of 150 cards per minute. Timing was quite critical throughout the operation of the card punch, the card reader and the printer, all being based on electromechanical principles. The basic card punch mechanism was manufactured by Bull, a French company which owned patents on 80-column punch card machines. The machine came in two versions, the P147 and the P67, the main difference being electromagnetic clutch or a solenoid operated mechanical "dog" clutch to initiate a punch cycle. Since many gears, electrical contact cams were affixed to the main shaft with taper pins, the P 67 with its severe stopping dog clutch would cause timing loss more frequently than the P 147. Most emergency maintenance time was spent replacing worn and damaged taper pins and retiming the machine. The card punch had a preread station, a punch station and a checkread station. The machine could be quite difficult to maintain and required much skill to troubleshoot and maintain. The machine cycle was oddly divided into 420 "points" or "Bull degrees".

While the Bull punch was used with the UNIVAC Solid State 80 for 80-column cards the UNIVAC Solid State 90 used the Univac manufactured "Tower Punch" for 90-column cards. The Tower Punch operating at 150 cards per minute used mechanical pin sensing in the pre punch read and the post punch read stations giving the ability to read a card, punch additional information into the card, and check read the results in the post punch station.

== See also ==
- List of UNIVAC products
- History of computing hardware
