= UNIVAC FASTRAND =

Magnetic drum mass storage system

FASTRAND was a magnetic drum mass storage system built by Sperry Rand Corporation (later Sperry Univac) for their UNIVAC 1100 series and 418/490/494 series computers. A FASTRAND subsystem consisted of one or two Control Units and up to eight FASTRAND units. A dual-access FASTRAND subsystem included two complete control units, and provided parallel data paths that allowed simultaneous operations on any two FASTRAND units in the subsystem. Each control unit interfaced to one (optionally two) 1100 Series (36-bit), or 490 Series (30-bit), parallel I/O channels.

A voice coil actuator moved a bar containing multiple single track recording heads, so these drums operated much like moving head disk drives with multiple disks. The heads "flew" on self-acting hydrodynamic air bearings. The drums had a plated magnetic recording surface. An optional feature called Fastband included 24 additional tracks with fixed read/write heads. This feature provided rapid access (35 ms. average access time), and a write lockout feature.

The Fastrands were very heavy (5,000 pounds) and large, approximately 8' long. Due to their weight, FASTRAND units were usually not installed on "false floor", and required special rigging and mounts to move and/or install. There were reported cases of drum bearing failures that caused the machine to tear itself apart and send the heavy drum crashing through walls.

At the time of their introduction the storage capacity exceeded any other random access mass storage disk or drum.

There were three models of FASTRAND drives:

- FASTRAND I had a single drum. The large mass of the rotating drum caused gyroscopic precession of the unit, making it tend to spin on the computer room floor as the Earth rotated under it. Very few of these devices were delivered.
- FASTRAND II (the majority of units produced) had two counter-rotating drums to eliminate the gyroscopic effect. One actuator bar with heads was located between the drums.
- FASTRAND III, introduced in 1970, was physically identical to the FASTRAND II, but increased the recording density by 50%.

== Specifications (FASTRAND II) ==
Storage capacity: 22,020,096 36-bit words = 132,120,576 6-bit FIELDATA characters = 99 megabytes (8-bit bytes) per device
Drum rotation rate: 880 RPM (14.7 rotations per second)
Heads: 64
Sector size: 28 36-bit words
Track size: 64 sectors (1,792 36-bit words)
Track density: 105 tracks per inch
Average Access time (seek time plus rotational latency): 92 milliseconds
Data transfer rate: 26,283 36-bit words per second = 118 kilobytes per second (8-bit bytes) on 1100 series machines
Recording density, one-dimensional: 1,000 bits per inch (along one track)
Recording density, two-dimensional: 105,000 bits per square inch of drum surface
Max FASTRAND devices (drum units) per controller: 8
Controller price: $41,680 (1968 US dollars)
FASTRAND device price: $134,400 (1968 dollars, equivalent to $1.22 million in 2024 dollars)
Weight per FASTRAND device: 4,500 pounds
Weight per kilobyte: 6 ounces (170 g)

== Storage allocation ==
Despite the name, FASTRAND was slow. The head positioning time was significant, so software allocated storage by tracks (1,792 words, 10,752 characters or 8,064 eight-bit bytes) or "positions", a group of 64 tracks (114,688 words, 688,128 characters or 510,096 eight-bit bytes) which were under the heads at a single time. This storage allocation method remained on the 1100 series machines long after drums had been replaced by disks.

The track storage units were checkboarded so that, with precise computation of the program's processing time, one could create software with processing time per unit of Fastrand blocks that resulted in a program running in synchronism with the data transfer rate of the drum. Further, the track-to-track head movement time afforded an additional processing speed coordination possibility that permitted the computational rate to match the data transfer rate for large (for the time) data sets without being delayed by losing synchronism with the mass storage transfers.

== See also ==
- List of UNIVAC products
- History of computing hardware
- The Story of Mel
