= UNISERVO I =

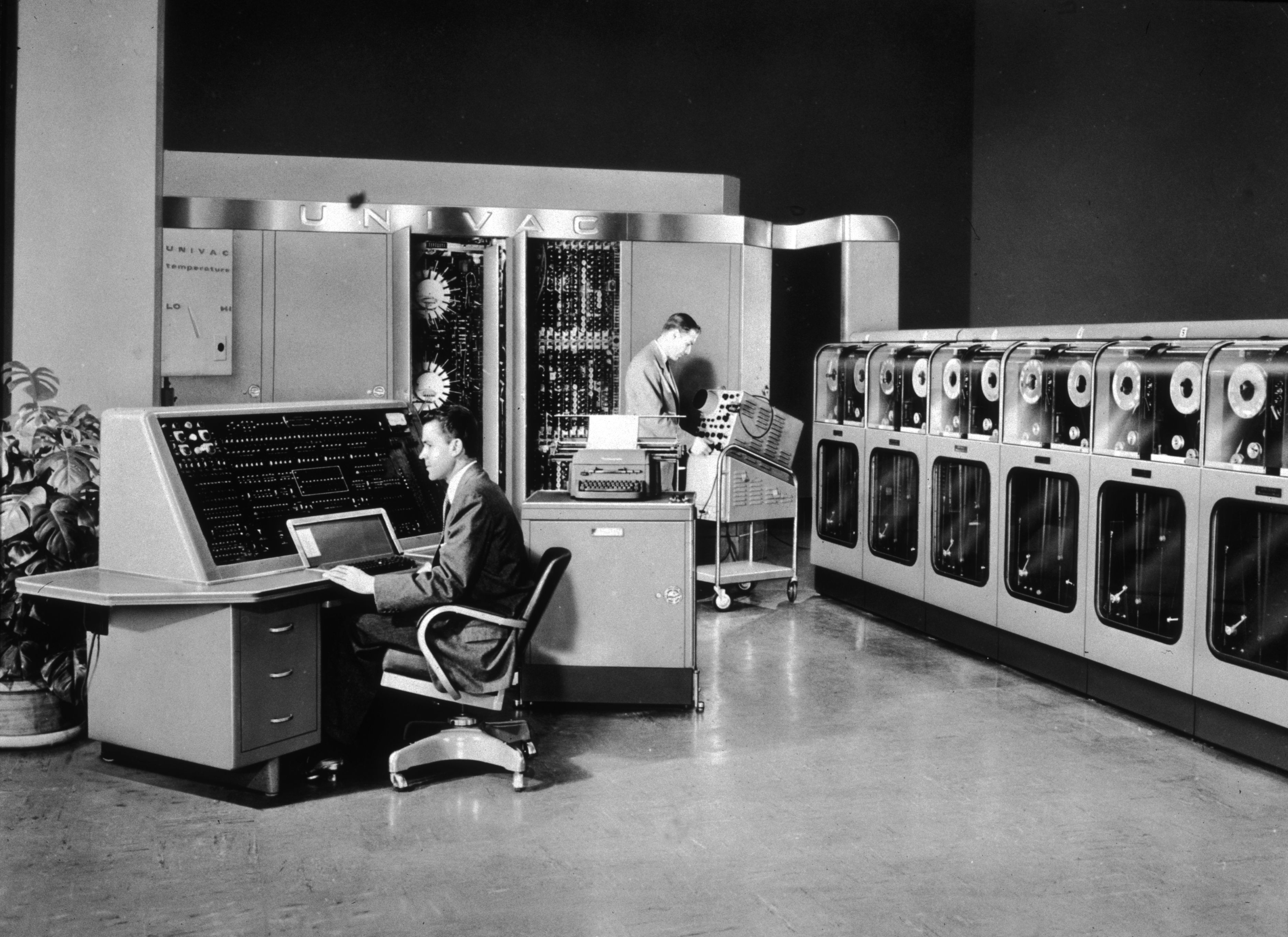
UNIVAC computer with a row of UNISERVO tape drives on the right

The UNISERVO tape drive was the primary I/O device on the UNIVAC I computer. It was the first tape drive for a commercially sold computer.

The UNISERVO used metal tape: a 1/2-inch-wide (13 mm) thin strip of nickel-plated phosphor bronze (called Vicalloy) 1200 feet long. These metal tapes and reels were very heavy with a combined weight of 25lbs. Data was recorded in eight channels on the tape (six for the data value, one parity channel for error checking, and one timing channel) at a density of 128 bits per inch. The tape could be moved at 100 inches per second, giving a nominal transfer rate of 12,800 characters per second. Data were recorded in fixed size blocks of 60 words of 12 characters each. Making allowance for the empty space between tape blocks, the actual transfer rate was around 7,200 characters per second.

The UNISERVO supported both forward and backward modes on read or write operation. This offered significant advantages in data sorting and merging applications. The data transfers to/from the UNIVAC I processor were fully buffered in a single block dedicated memory, permitting instruction execution in parallel with tape movement and data transfer. The internal serial data path permitted inserting a tape data block into main memory in one instruction.

UNIVAC continued to use the name UNISERVO for later models of tape drive (e.g., UNISERVO II, UNISERVO IIIC, UNISERVO VIII-C) for later computers in their product line. The UNISERVO II could read metal tapes from the UNIVAC I as well as use higher-density PET film base/ferric oxide media tapes that became the industry standard. While UNIVAC was first with computer tape, and had higher performance than contemporary IBM tape drives, IBM was able to set the data interchange standard. UNIVAC was later forced to be compatible with the IBM technology.

== Technical details ==
The tape motion in the UNISERVO I was controlled by a single capstan connected to a synchronous motor. Supply and take-up reel motion was buffered via a complex pulley-string-spring arrangement, as the design was prior to the invention of the vacuum column buffer. The tape drive contained a permanent leader, and each tape reel had a connector link to the leader. The nickel-plated phosphor bronze tapes were very abrasive, and to counter this problem a thin plastic wear tape was slowly moved over the recording head, between the head and the tape, preventing the recording head from quickly wearing out. The metal tapes also were dirty, and a slowly renewed felt wiper collected tape debris. The UNISERVO I had a high-speed rewind capability, and multiple drives on the UNIVAC I could rewind while others continued with data processing reads or writes.

The later UNISERVO IIA and IIIA omitted the plastic wear tape and felt wipers, since they were primarily used with PET film-base magnetic tape. Both continued the use of single capstan drives and were vacuum column designs. The IIIC and later tapes used NRZI encoding to be compatible with the IBM 729 series tape drives which set the industry standard for data interchange. Ironically, IBM then later switched to phase encoding in its 1600-bit-per-inch tape generation because of its superior data reliability.

== See also ==
- History of computing hardware
- List of UNIVAC products
