= List of Guggenheim Fellowships awarded in 1963 =

Two hundred and sixty-nine scholars and artists were awarded Guggenheim Fellowships in 1963. More than $1,388,000 was disbursed.

== 1963 U.S. and Canadian Fellows ==
Category	Field of Study	Fellow	Institutional association	Research topic	Notes	Ref
Creative Arts	Drama and Performance Art	Jack Gelber			Also won in 1966	
Creative Arts	Fiction	Ivan Gold		Writing		
Creative Arts	Fiction	John Alexander Graves III	Texas Christian University	Writing		
Creative Arts	Fiction	James Purdy		Writing	Also won in 1958	
Creative Arts	Fine Arts	Carmen Cicero	Sarah Lawrence College	Painting	Also won in 1957	
Creative Arts	Fine Arts	Harrison Covington	University of South Florida	Painting		
Creative Arts	Fine Arts	George J. Miyasaki	California College of Arts and Crafts	Printmaking		
Creative Arts	Fine Arts	Roland C. Petersen	University of California, Davis	Painting		
Creative Arts	Fine Arts	Rudolph O. Pozzatti	Indiana University	Creative printmaking		
Creative Arts	Fine Arts	Lorinda Roland				
Creative Arts	Fine Arts	Seymour Rosofsky	Wright Junior College	Painting	Also won in 1962	
Creative Arts	Fine Arts	Satoru Abe				
Creative Arts	Fine Arts	Abram Schlemowitz	Pratt Institute			
Creative Arts	Fine Arts	Julius Schmidt	Cranbrook Academy of Art			
Creative Arts	Fine Arts	Louis B. Sloan	Pennsylvania Academy of the Fine Arts			
Creative Arts	Fine Arts	Jerome P. Witkin	Maryland Institute College of Art	Painting		
Creative Arts	Music Composition	Alvin Etler	Smith College	Composing	Also won in 1940, 1941	
Creative Arts	Music Composition	Gene Gutchë		Composing	Also won in 1964	
Creative Arts	Music Composition	Billy Jim Layton	Harvard University	Composing		
Creative Arts	Music Composition	Gunther A. Schuller	Manhattan School of Music	Composing	Also won in 1962	
Creative Arts	Music Composition	Robert Starer	Juilliard School	Composing	Also won in 1957	
Creative Arts	Music Composition	Peter Talbot Westergaard	Columbia University	Composing		
Creative Arts	Music Composition	Michael White (1931-2022)	Juilliard School	Composing		
Creative Arts	Music Composition	Charles Whittenberg	Columbia-Princeton Electronic Music Center	Composing	Also won in 1964	
Creative Arts	Photography	Diane Arbus		"American Rites, Manners and Customs" project	Also won in 1966	
Creative Arts	Photography	Dave Heath		The human condition in the United States	Also won in 1964	
Creative Arts	Poetry	Alan Dugan		Writing	Also won in 1972	
Creative Arts	Poetry	Robert Duncan		Writing		
Creative Arts	Poetry	Edward Field		Writing		
Creative Arts	Poetry	Donald Hall	University of Michigan	Writing	Also won in 1972	
Creative Arts	Poetry	Richard Purdy Wilbur	Wesleyan University	Writing	Also won in 1952	
Humanities	Architecture, Planning and Design	Frederick Doveton Nichols	University of Virginia			
Humanities	Architecture, Planning and Design	Bernard Rudofsky	Museum of Modern Art		Also won in 1964, 1971	
Humanities	Architecture, Planning and Design	Eduard Sekler	Harvard University	Historical urban spaces	Also won in 1961	
Humanities	American Literature	Sherman Paul	University of Illinois	Emersonian influences in contemporary intellectuals		
Humanities	Bibliography	Thomas Randolph Adams	Brown University	British pamphlet literature relating to the American revolutions		
Humanities	Bibliography	James Meriwether	University of North Carolina	Textual bibliography of the writings of William Faulkner		
Humanities	British History	Carl B. Cone	University of Kentucky	Social and economic history of English Protestant dissent in the 18th century		
Humanities	British History	David Davies	Claremont Colleges	Lives and times of Sir Thomas Shirley and his three sons		
Humanities	British History	Lacey B. Smith	Northwestern University	Political power during the last phase of the reign of Henry VIII		
Humanities	British History	David Harris Willson	University of Minnesota		Also won in 1941, 1943, 1948	
Humanities	Classics	Louis Harry Feldman	Yeshiva College	Flavius Josephus and his relation to Hellenistic writers and traditional Jewish literature		
Humanities	Classics	Harald Reiche	Massachusetts Institute of Technology	Problem of anthropomorphism in Greek philosophy and early Christian theology		
Humanities	East Asian Studies	Cyril Birch	University of California, Berkeley	Chinese writers		
Humanities	East Asian Studies	William Samolin	Columbia University			
Humanities	Economic History	Lance E. Davis	Purdue University	Effects of capital immobility on structure and location of US and British industry		
Humanities	English Literature	Jerome Hamilton Buckley	Harvard University	Victorian literature	Also won in 1946	
Humanities	English Literature	Thomas Wellsted Copeland	University of Massachusetts	Biography of Edmund Burke	Also won in 1951	
Humanities	English Literature	Mario A. Di Cesare	Harpur College	Work on his book Vergil's Aenid and the Epic Tradition		
Humanities	English Literature	Oliver Watkins Ferguson	Duke University	Writings of Oliver Goldsmith		
Humanities	English Literature	Thomas B. Flanagan	University of California, Berkeley	Rise of modern Irish literature		
Humanities	English Literature	George H. Ford	University of Rochester	Concept of time in Victorian literature		
Humanities	English Literature	Oliver Bennett Hardison, Jr.	University of North Carolina	Book-length study of the origins of medieval drama		
Humanities	English Literature	William Harvey Marshall	University of Pennsylvania			
Humanities	English Literature	Robert D. Mayo	Northwestern University	Oliver Goldsmith's periodical writings as a phase of his development		
Humanities	English Literature	Martin Meisel	Dartmouth College	19th-century English theatre	Also won in 1987	
Humanities	English Literature	Constantinos A. Patrides	University of California, Berkeley	Milton's conception and presentation of the central themes of the Christian faith	Also won in 1960	
Humanities	English Literature	James Louis Rosier	University of Michigan			
Humanities	English Literature	George Winchester Stone, Jr.	New York University	London stage, 1660-1800	Also won in 1950, 1951	
Humanities	Fine Arts Research	Dore Ashton	Cooper Union		Also won in 1969	
Humanities	Fine Arts Research	John Franklin Haskins	Finch College	Thomas Jefferson	Also won in 1958	
Humanities	Fine Arts Research	Richard Krautheimer	New York University		Also won in 1950, 1953	
Humanities	Fine Arts Research	Earl E. Rosenthal	University of Chicago	Original design in the Palace of Charles V in Granada		
Humanities	French History	Peter Henry Amann	Oakland University			
Humanities	French History	Nancy Lyman Roelker	Winsor School	Life of Jeanne d'Albret and her role in the history of French Protestantism		
Humanities	French Literature	Leonard Pronko	Pomona College	Influence of the Oriental theater and dance on the contemporary French theater		
Humanities	French Literature	Karl David Uitti	Princeton University			
Humanities	General Nonfiction	Benjamin DeMott	Amherst College	American attitudes toward work and leisure	Also won in 1967	
Humanities	General Nonfiction	Dwight MacDonald		Edgar Allan Poe		
Humanities	German and East European History	Willard Allen Fletcher	University of Colorado	German occupation of the Grand Duchy of Luxembourg during World War II		
Humanities	German and East European History	Stavro Skendi	Columbia University			
Humanities	German and East European History	Eugen Weber	University of California, Los Angeles			
Humanities	German and Scandinavian Literature	Bernhard Blume	Harvard University	Symbolism in German and French poetry	Also won in 1954	
Humanities	German and Scandinavian Literature	Walter Grossman	Harvard University	Johann Christian Edelmann		
Humanities	German and Scandinavian Literature	Gerhard Loose	University of Colorado	Works of Heinrich Mann		
Humanities	History of Science and Technology	Josef Eisinger	Bell Telephone Laboratories	Role of metal ions in protein synthesis	Also won in 1977	
Humanities	History of Science and Technology	June Zimmerman Fullmer	Newcomb College	Life and letters of Humphry Davy		
Humanities	Italian Literature	Francis Fergusson	Rutgers University	Biography of Dante		
Humanities	Italian Literature	Nicolas J. Perella	University of California, Berkeley	Life and works of Giacomo Leopardi		
Humanities	Linguistics	Dean Stoddard Worth	University of California, Los Angeles			
Humanities	Linguistics	Gerta Hüttl-Folter	University of California, Los Angeles			
Humanities	Literary Criticism	Herschel Clay Baker	Harvard University	Rennaisance thought	Also won in 1956	
Humanities	Literary Criticism	Peter Alexis Boodberg	University of California, Berkeley	Classical Chinese script	Also won in 1938, 1955	
Humanities	Literary Criticism	Walker Gibson	New York University	Modern prose style		
Humanities	Literary Criticism	William Hugh Kenner	University of California, Santa Barbara	Research for his book The Pound Era	Also won in 1956	
Humanities	Medieval History	John Frederic Benton	University of Pennsylvania			
Humanities	Medieval History	William Marvin Bowsky	University of Nebraska	Italian commune Siena during the 13th and 14th centuries	Also won in 1985	
Humanities	Medieval History	James A. Brundage	University of Wisconsin	Status, obligations and privileges of the Crusaders in medieval law		
Humanities	Medieval History	Robert I. Burns	University of California, San Francisco	Clash between Muslims and Christians in the 13th century		
Humanities	Medieval History	John Hine Mundy	Columbia University	Theories of war and society in 15th-century France	Also won in 1977	
Humanities	Medieval History	Ihor Ševčenko	Columbia University			
Humanities	Medieval History	Robert Lee Wolff	Harvard University	Relations between Byzantium and the West from the reign of Justinian I to the fall of Constantinople to the Turks		
Humanities	Medieval Literature	William Compaine Calin	Dartmouth College	French epic in the 13th century		
Humanities	Medieval Literature	Arthur R. Heiserman	University of Chicago	Narrative techniques in medieval romances		
Humanities	Music Research	Howard Mayer Brown	University of Chicago	Music in the 16th-century Italian theater		
Humanities	Music Research	Sylvia Kenney	University of California, Los Angeles	The motet in the 15th century		
Humanities	Near Eastern Studies	George Fadlo Hourani	University of Michigan			
Humanities	Near Eastern Studies	Erle Verdun Leichty	University of Chicago	Ancient Mesopotamian rituals		
Humanities	Philosophy	Bruce Arthur Aune	University of Pittsburgh	Problems concerning the relation between the mental and the physical		
Humanities	Philosophy	John F. A. Taylor	Michigan State University			
Humanities	Religion	Brevard Springs Childs	Yale University Divinity School	Exegetical methods by which the rabbinic sages interpreted the Book of Exodus		
Humanities	Religion	Julian N. Hartt	Yale University	Theological interpretations of the arts		
Humanities	Religion	John H. Hick	Princeton Theological Seminary	Philosophical problem of evil	Also won in 1985	
Humanities	Religion	Edward L. Long, Jr.	Oberlin College	Types of religious morality		
Humanities	Rennaisance History	Deno J. Geanakoplos	University of Illinois	Influence of Byzantine- and Venetian-dominated Crete on the Renaissance of Europe		
Humanities	Russian History	Alfred Meyer	Michigan State University			
Humanities	Slavic Literature	William B. Edgerton	Indiana University	Life, thought and art of Nikolai Leskov		
Humanities	Spanish and Portuguese Literature	Manuel E. Durán	Yale University	Works of Francisco de Quevedo		
Humanities	Spanish and Portuguese Literature	Joaquín González-Muela	Case Western Reserve University	Syntactical problems in the Spanish language		
Humanities	Theatre Arts	Eldon Elder				
Humanities	United States History	Hugh Coleman Bailey	Howard College	Life and achievements of Edgar Gardner Murphy in the fields of race relations, child labor and public education in the South at the turn of the century		
Humanities	United States History	Charles Albro Barker	Johns Hopkins University	American public thought from colonial to recent times		
Humanities	United States History	Thomas D. Clark	University of Kentucky	Newspapers of Louisville and their influence on the economic, social and political history of the Ohio Valley		
Humanities	United States History	Fred Louis Engelman	Young and Rubicam	Domestic history of the War of 1812, a study of the administration of James Madison, and the campaign to conquer Canada		
Humanities	United States History	E. James Ferguson	University of Maryland			
Humanities	United States History	Jack Douglas Forbes	San Fernando Valley State College	Inter-ethnic relations in California, particularly on the dynamics of European-Indian contacts in the Chumash region		
Humanities	United States History	Mary Elizabeth Massey	South Carolina State College for Women	Effects of the American Civil War on women		
Humanities	United States History	Malcolm C. McMillan	Auburn University	Biography of Daniel Pratt		
Humanities	United States History	Doyce Blackman Nunis		Hudson's Bay Company and the California fur trade during the Mexican Era		
Humanities	United States History	Charles Grier Sellers	University of California, Berkeley	Biography of James K. Polk		
Humanities	United States History	Marshall Smelser	University of Notre Dame	US History from 1801 to 1817 with emphasis on public affairs		
Humanities	United States History	Edouard A. Stackpole	Marine Historical Association	American whaling industry	Also won in 1951	
Humanities	United States History	David Dirck Van Tassel	University of Texas			
Natural Sciences	Applied Mathematics	Eli Sternberg	Brown University	Mathematical theories of elasticity and viscoelasticity		
Natural Sciences	Astronomy and Astrophysics	Leon Trilling	Massachusetts Institute of Technology	Process of interaction of gas molecules with solid surfaces under conditions of very low density		
Natural Sciences	Chemistry	Ralph N. Adams	University of Kansas	EPR-electrochemistry		
Natural Sciences	Chemistry	Fred Colvig Anson	California Institute of Technology	Electrical double layer		
Natural Sciences	Chemistry	James A. Campbell	Harvey Mudd College	Absorption spectra of chromium compounds		
Natural Sciences	Chemistry	Samuel Henry Davis, Jr.	Rice University			
Natural Sciences	Chemistry	Arthur William Fairhall	University of Washington			
Natural Sciences	Chemistry	Harold M. Feder	Argonne National Laboratory, University of Chicago	Thermodynamic transport properties of alloys		
Natural Sciences	Chemistry	Frank Henry Field	Humble Oil			
Natural Sciences	Chemistry	Carl Wesley Garland	Massachusetts Institute of Technology	Elastic properties of crystals near a lambda point		
Natural Sciences	Chemistry	John Ferguson Harris, Jr.	DuPont	Chemistry of small-ring compounds		
Natural Sciences	Chemistry	Frank B. Mallory	Bryn Mawr College			
Natural Sciences	Chemistry	Norman E. Phillips	University of California, Berkeley	Properties of metals at extremely low temperatures		
Natural Sciences	Chemistry	Eugene George Rochow	Harvard University	Organosilicon chemistry		
Natural Sciences	Chemistry	Ignacio Tinoco	University of California, Berkeley	Conformation and sequence of nucleic acids		
Natural Sciences	Chemistry	Jürg Waser	California Institute of Technology	Methods of teaching chemistry		
Natural Sciences	Computer Science	Lloyd D. Fosdick	University of Illinois	Probabilistic methods for solving problems in statistical physics using high-speed computers		
Natural Sciences	Computer Science	Marvin L. Stein	University of Minnesota			
Natural Sciences	Earth Science	George Edward Backus	University of California, San Diego	Methods of obtaining approximate solutions of linear short-wave-propagation problems of geophysical interest	Also won in 1970	
Natural Sciences	Earth Science	Charles W. Collinson	Illinois State Geological Survey	European and American Devonian and Carboniferous faunas		
Natural Sciences	Earth Science	Robert Ross Compton	Stanford University	Structural development of the Santa Lucia Mountains		
Natural Sciences	Earth Science	John L. Rosenfeld	University of California, Los Angeles			
Natural Sciences	Earth Science	William Harris Taubeneck	Oregon State University	Petrogenesis of granitic rocks		
Natural Sciences	Earth Science	George A. Thompson	Stanford University	Ultramafic rocks		
Natural Sciences	Earth Science	James Burleigh Thompson	Harvard University	Regional metamorphism and its relation to Alpine structure and phase equilibria in metamorphic rocks		
Natural Sciences	Earth Science	J. Lamar Worzel	Columbia University			
Natural Sciences	Engineering	Turan Onat	Brown University	Mechanics of nonlinear materials		
Natural Sciences	Engineering	Donald O. Pederson	University of California, Berkeley	Semi-conductor integrated circuits		
Natural Sciences	Engineering	Walter Guido Vincenti	Stanford University	High temperature gas dynamics		
Natural Sciences	Mathematics	James Gilbert Glimm	Massachusetts Institute of Technology	Nonlinear ordinary differential equations and partial differential equations	Also won in 1965	
Natural Sciences	Mathematics	David Kent Harrison	University of Pennsylvania	Theory of Abelian groups		
Natural Sciences	Mathematics	Lawrence Markus	University of Minnesota			
Natural Sciences	Medicine and Health	José Manuel Rodriguez Delgado	Yale University	Physiological basis of behavior		
Natural Sciences	Molecular and Cellular Biology	Ronald Bentley	University of Pittsburgh	Metabolism in molds		
Natural Sciences	Molecular and Cellular Biology	Ernest B. Bueding	Johns Hopkins University	Relationship between the biochemical and the electrophysiological actions of adrenalin on smooth intestinal muscle		
Natural Sciences	Molecular and Cellular Biology	Eugene A. Delwiche	Cornell University	Electron transport reactions of certain bacteria		
Natural Sciences	Molecular and Cellular Biology	Edmond Henry Fischer	University of Washington			
Natural Sciences	Molecular and Cellular Biology	Heinz Fraenkel-Conrat	University of California, Berkeley		Also won in 1967	
Natural Sciences	Molecular and Cellular Biology	George Brampton Koelle	University of Pennsylvania School of Medicine	Transmission of nerve impulses and their modification by drugs		
Natural Sciences	Molecular and Cellular Biology	Franklin Hutchinson	Yale University	Genetic coding problem, particularly by the methods of bacteriophage genetics		
Natural Sciences	Molecular and Cellular Biology	Salvador E. Luria	Massachusetts Institute of Technology	Biosynthetic processes initiated by phage infection	Also won in 1942, 1953	
Natural Sciences	Molecular and Cellular Biology	Alexander Rich	Massachusetts Institute of Technology	Mechanism of protein synthesis		
Natural Sciences	Molecular and Cellular Biology	Verne Normal Schumaker	University of Pennsylvania			
Natural Sciences	Molecular and Cellular Biology	Alec Sehon	McGill University			
Natural Sciences	Molecular and Cellular Biology	Roberts A. Smith	University of California, Los Angeles			
Natural Sciences	Molecular and Cellular Biology	Harold Edwin Umbarger	Cold Spring Harbor Laboratory			
Natural Sciences	Molecular and Cellular Biology	Heinz von Foerster	University of Illinois	Molecular mechanisms in biological memory	Also won in 1956	
Natural Sciences	Molecular and Cellular Biology	Raymond Grover Wolfe	University of Oregon	Chemical structure of enzyme proteins		
Natural Sciences	Neuroscience	Charles Maitland Fair		Neurophysiology substrates of behavior		
Natural Sciences	Neuroscience	Elwin Marg	University of California, Berkeley	Response to microstimulation within the visual system		
Natural Sciences	Neuroscience	C. Ladd Prosser	University of Illinois	Central nervous changes in fish acclimated to different temperatures		
Natural Sciences	Organismic Biology and Ecology	Angel Chua Alcala	Stanford University		Also won in 1965	
Natural Sciences	Organismic Biology and Ecology	Richard John Andrew	Yale University	Causation of vocalisation and associated behavior in chicks and primates		
Natural Sciences	Organismic Biology and Ecology	Lester G. Barth	Columbia University			
Natural Sciences	Organismic Biology and Ecology	Lincoln Brower	Amherst College	Ecology and animal behavior		
Natural Sciences	Organismic Biology and Ecology	Perry Webster Gilbert	Cornell University	Shark reproduction	Also won in 1956	
Natural Sciences	Organismic Biology and Ecology	Charles E. Huntington	Bowdoin College	Leach's Petrel for publication		
Natural Sciences	Organismic Biology and Ecology	Leonard MaGruder Passano III	Yale University	Electrical activity of the nervous system		
Natural Sciences	Organismic Biology and Ecology	John Cassidy Marr	U.S. Bureau of Commercial Fisheries	Fluctuations in abundance and distribution of certain marine fishes		
Natural Sciences	Organismic Biology and Ecology	Jay M. Savage	University of Southern California	Tropical biology		
Natural Sciences	Organismic Biology and Ecology	Evelyn Shaw	American Museum of Natural History			
Natural Sciences	Organismic Biology and Ecology	George Wald	Harvard University	Single and multiple visual systems in invertebrates		
Natural Sciences	Organismic Biology and Ecology	Mary Ann Williams	University of California, Berkeley	Relationships between diet and tissue enzymes and coenzyme levels		
Natural Sciences	Physics	Anthony Schuyler Arrott	Ford Motor Company			
Natural Sciences	Physics	Eugene I. Blount	Bell Telephone Laboratories	Electric properties of crystals		
Natural Sciences	Physics	Robert R. Brown	University of California, Berkeley	Ionospheric and geomagnetic disturbance accompanying electron bombardment of the auroral zone atmosphere		
Natural Sciences	Physics	Kenneth Case	University of Michigan			
Natural Sciences	Physics	Kurt Gottfried	Harvard University	Theories of ferromagnetism		
Natural Sciences	Physics	Charles Kittel	University of California, Berkeley	Magnetic properties of the transition metals	Also won in 1945, 1956	
Natural Sciences	Physics	Walter Kohn	University of California, San Diego			
Natural Sciences	Physics	Riccardo Levi-Setti	University of Chicago	Lambda-binding energy of heavy hypernuclei		
Natural Sciences	Physics	Hugh McManus	Michigan State University			
Natural Sciences	Physics	Michael Nauenberg	Columbia University			
Natural Sciences	Physics	Reinhard Oehme	University of Chicago	Structure and interactions of elementary particles		
Natural Sciences	Physics	Samuel Penner	National Bureau of Standards	Photoproduction of elementary particles		
Natural Sciences	Physics	Aihud Pevsner	Johns Hopkins University	Properties of fundamental particles and resonances	Also won in 1970	
Natural Sciences	Physics	Edward A. Stern	University of Maryland			
Natural Sciences	Physics	Stephen Tamor	General Electric Research Laboratory			
Natural Sciences	Physics	Theos Jardin Thompson	Massachusetts Institute of Technology	Problems of nuclear reactor safety		
Natural Sciences	Physics	Michael Tinkham	University of California, Berkeley	Solid-state physics, with emphasis on superconductivity and magnetism		
Natural Sciences	Physics	Christopher Bland Walker	U.S. Army Materials Research Agency	Thermal vibrations in crystals		
Natural Sciences	Physics	Byron Terry Wright	University of California, Los Angeles			
Natural Sciences	Plant Science	John Grieve Bald	University of California, Los Angeles		Also won in 1955	
Natural Sciences	Plant Science	Harlan Parker Banks	Cornell University	Devonian fossil plants		
Natural Sciences	Plant Science	Ellis F. Darley	University of California, Riverside			
Natural Sciences	Plant Science	David Gottlieb	University of Illinois	Developmental biochemistry of fungi as related to the cellular basis of aging		
Natural Sciences	Plant Science	Walter Hepworth Lewis	Stephen F. Austin State University			
Natural Sciences	Plant Science	Lawrence Rappaport	University of California, Davis	Post-harvest physiology of plants		
Natural Sciences	Plant Science	Clarence Sterling	University of California, Davis	Plant crystal structure	Also won in 1956	
Natural Sciences	Plant Science	Frederick C. Steward	Cornell University	Cell biology, metabolism, growth and development in plants		
Natural Sciences	Plant Science	Paul Edward Waggoner	Connecticut Agricultural Experiment Station	Methods for regulating the water economy and energetics of plants		
Natural Sciences	Statistics	Rosedith Sitgreaves	Columbia University			
Social Sciences	Anthropology and Cultural Studies	Loren Corey Eiseley	University of Pennsylvania		Also won in 1972	
Social Sciences	Anthropology and Cultural Studies	Robert F. Heizer	University of California, Berkeley	Development of technologies in early societies, with special reference to the long distance transport of multi-ton stones for monuments and construction	Also won in 1972	
Social Sciences	Anthropology and Cultural Studies	D'Arcy McNickle	American Indian Development, Inc.	Community development and leadership training in the eastern Navajo district centered at Crownpoint, New Mexico		
Social Sciences	Anthropology and Cultural Studies	Irving Rouse	Yale University	Processes of cultural evolution		
Social Sciences	Economics	Arcadius Kahan	University of Chicago	Individual and collectivized agriculture		
Social Sciences	Economics	Dwight E. Robinson	University of Washington School of Business	Fashion and design		
Social Sciences	Geography and Environmental Studies	Erich Isaac	City College of New York			
Social Sciences	Geography and Environmental Studies	Frederick J. Simoons	University of Wisconsin	Origins and spread of dairying in the Middle East of Africa		
Social Sciences	Geography and Environmental Studies	Norman J. W. Thrower	University of California, Los Angeles	Edmond Halley		
Social Sciences	Geography and Environmental Studies	William Huston Wallace	University of New Hampshire	Changing role and functions of New England railroads		
Social Sciences	Law	Edward L. Barrett	University of California, Berkeley	Law and practices in the investigation of crime and the handling of suspected offenders prior to trial in certain European countries		
Social Sciences	Law	Julius Cohen	Rutgers University School of Law			
Social Sciences	Political Science	Carey B. Joynt	Lehigh University			
Social Sciences	Political Science	Donald E. Stokes	University of Michigan			
Social Sciences	Sociology	Robert Dubin	University of Oregon	German industry and employee relations		
Social Sciences	Sociology	Kurt B. Mayer	Brown University	Impact of post-war immigration on Switzerland		
Social Sciences	Sociology	Robert A. Nisbet	University of California, Riverside	Work on what would become Sociological Tradition (1966)		
Social Sciences	Sociology	Donald Pierson	Escola de Sociologia e Política (later part of University of São Paulo)	Spanish and Portuguese traditional cultural patterns as compared to those of Latin America		

== 1963 Latin American and Caribbean Fellows ==
Category	Field of Study	Fellow	Institutional association	Research topic	Notes	Ref
Creative Arts	Fine Arts	Sarah Grilo		Painting	Also won in 1961	
Creative Arts	Fine Arts	Alfredo Da Silva				
Humanities	Iberian and Latin American History	Rafael Olivar-Bertrand	Universidad Nacional del Sur		Also won in 1963	
Humanities	Spanish and Portuguese Literature	Raúl Silva Castro				
Natural Sciences	Applied Mathematics	Enrique Grünbaum Daniel	University of Chile		Also won in 1963	
Natural Sciences	Earth Science	Osvaldo Reig	Universidad de Buenos Aires		Also won in 1970	
Natural Sciences	Mathematics	Djairo Guedes de Figueiredo	University of Brazil		Also won in 1982	
Natural Sciences	Mathematics	Elon Lages Lima	Brazilian Center for Research in Physics		Also won in 1961	
Natural Sciences	Medicine and Health	Jacques P. Balansa	Hospital Universitario Asunción			
Natural Sciences	Medicine and Health	Samy Frenk Guiloff	University of Chile			
Natural Sciences	Medicine and Health	Norberto A. Schor	National University of Córdoba			
Natural Sciences	Molecular and Cellular Biology	Livio Barnafi Godina	Pontifical Catholic University of Chile			
Natural Sciences	Molecular and Cellular Biology	Raúl N. Ondarza Vidaurreta	National Autonomous University of Mexico			
Natural Sciences	Molecular and Cellular Biology	Américo Pomales-Lebrón	University of Puerto Rico School of Medicine		Also won in 1954	
Natural Sciences	Molecular and Cellular Biology	Marco Aurelio Rivarola	Hospital de Niños		Also won in 1965	
Natural Sciences	Molecular and Cellular Biology	Marino Villavicencio Núñez	National University of San Marcos		Also won in 1962	
Natural Sciences	Neuroscience	Enrique López Mendoza	National Institute of Cardiology		Also won in 1962, 1964	
Natural Sciences	Organismic Biology and Ecology	Moacir Alvarenga	National Museum of Brazil			
Natural Sciences	Plant Science	Bernardo Rosengurtt	University of the Republic			
Social Sciences	Education	John Joseph Maria Figueroa				

== See also ==
- Guggenheim Fellowship
- List of Guggenheim Fellowships awarded in 1962
- List of Guggenheim Fellowships awarded in 1964
