= Maria Razumovsky =

Austrian librarian and writer (1923–2000)

- Born: Maria Gräfin Razumovsky von Wigstein; 9 March 1923; Dolní Životice, Czechoslovakia
- Died: 4 October 2015 (aged 92); Vienna, Austria
- Occupations: Librarian; writer; diarist
- Relatives: Gregor Razumovsky (nephew)

Secretary of the International Federation of Library Associations and Institutions
- In office 1962–1962
- Preceded by: Joachim Wieder
- Succeeded by: Anthony Thompson

Academic work
- Discipline: Russian literature
- Institutions: Austrian National Library; United Nations Library; UNESCO

Maria Gräfin Razumovsky von Wigstein (9 March 1923 – 4 October 2015) was an Austrian librarian and writer. A Sudeten German expelled from Czechoslovakia after World War II, she worked at the Austrian National Library for four decades, with her work including serving as head of Russian literature acquisitions and of international relations. She was also a United Nations official and served as interim secretary of the International Federation of Library Associations and Institutions for a short time in 1962. She also wrote and edited several scholarly works, including two books on Marina Tsvetayeva.

== Biography ==
Maria Gräfin Razumovsky von Wigstein was born on 9 March 1923 in Schloss Schönstein in Dolní Životice. She was one of five children born to white émigré landowner Andreas Razumovsky (1892–1981) and Katharina zu Sayn-Wittgenstein (1895–1983). Born to the Imperial Russian Razumovsky noble family, her great-grandfather was the naturalist Grigory Razumovsky. She was of Jewish descent through her paternal grandmother Marie Wiener von Welten, sister of landowner Rudolf Wiener-Welten.

Razumovsky passed her Matura at a Opava school in 1941, and attended Kautezky School in Vienna after the Nazi regime barred her from university due to her status as a 2nd-degree Mischling. Her best friend from school was Gerta Hüttl-Folter, who lived at Razumovsky's family residence after the Hüttls lost their home and her father sent to Dachau concentration camp when Nazi Germany annexed Austria in 1938. Her family was expelled from Czechoslovakia after World War II, and moved to Vienna in 1946.

Razumovsky started working at the Austrian National Library in 1946. She headed the library's acquisitions department for Russian literature, as well as the Department for International Relations. Drawing on her experiences with learning Russian, she helped exchange books with Eastern Bloc states when financial exchange was impractical, with the work of Chinghiz Aitmatov and Herta Müller reaching Austria while Eastern Bloc libraries received the work of Sigmund Freud, Theodor Herzl, and Franz Kafka in return. Closely associated with several Russian dissidents in the arts, she helped some (including Lev Kopelev) flee the Soviet Union through the Austrian National Library's Slavic Studies Room. In 1986, she retired from the Austrian National Library, doing so early to allow a recent father on expiring parental leave to assume a permanent position.

Razumovsky was also a United Nations official in the 1950s, working at the United Nations Library and the UNESCO division of libraries, and she assisted in the ratification of the 1958 Convention concerning the Exchange of Official Publications and Government Documents between States. In 1962, she served as interim secretary of the International Federation of Library Associations and Institutions. She was first vice-president of the Association of Austrian Librarians (VÖB) from 1978 to 1980. She attended the 1991 IFLA conference amidst the collapse of the Soviet Union. Werner Rotter and Eva Ramminger called Razumovsky a "highly esteemed writer and librarian", saying that her "name deserves to be remembered in" the context of how librarians "ensured that concepts such as educational exchange, multilingualism, and multiculturalism are now part of our way of life".

Razumovsky also wrote or edited several works, several of a scholarly nature. She wrote two books on Marina Tsvetaeva; Rotter and Ramminger said that Razumovsky's translations "made the author, who died at the age of 30, known in the German-speaking world." She also translated several foreign works, including Eugène Ternovsky's Portret v sumerkakh. She translated her mother's diary to German and it was published as Als unsere Welt unterging in 1984. She also published two volumes of diaries she and her sisters Daria and Olga wrote.

Through her brother Andreas, Razumovsky was sister-in-law of journalist Dorothea Gräfin Razumovsky the paternal aunt of artist Katharina Razumovsky and historian and activist Gregor Razumovsky. She was active in the Russian Orthodox Church, being part of a church choir at a Vienna church.

Razumovsky died on 4 October 2015 in Vienna. She had lived in a retirement home in Vienna during her final years.

== Works ==
=== Authored books ===
- Marina Zwetajewa: Mythos und Wahrheit (1981)
- Marina Tsvetayeva: A Critical Biography (1989)
- Die Rasumovskys: Eine Familie am Zarenhof (1998)
- Mascha, Dolly, Olga Razumovsky: Unsere versteckten Tagebücher 1938–44 (1999)
- Maria, Daria und Olga Razumovsky. Unser Abschied von der tschechischen Heimat. Tagebücher 1945–1946 (2000)

=== Translations and others ===
- Nach der Dämmerung (1976; original by Eugène Ternovsky)
- Gedichte (1979; original by Marina Tsvetaeva)
- (as Elisabeth Neuhoff) Nomenklatura (1980; original by Michael Voslenski)
- Als unsere Welt unterging (1984; original by Katharina zu Sayn-Wittgenstein)
- Zwetajewa, Marina: Briefe an Vera Bunina und Dimitrij Schachowskoy (1991; original by Tsvetaeva)
