= UNIVAC 1103 =

Univac computer introduced in 1953

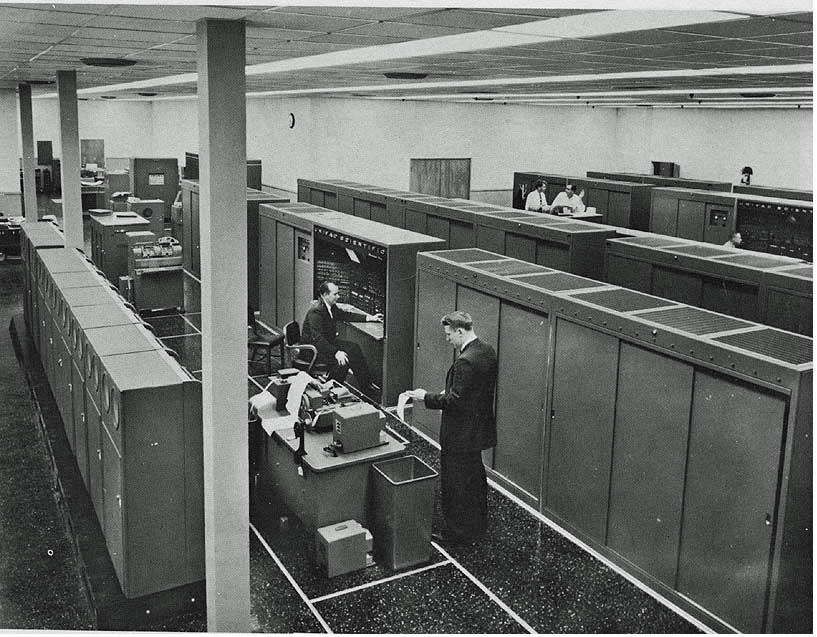
- UNIVAC 1103A
- Also known as: ERA 1103
- Developer: Engineering Research Associates
- Manufacturer: Remington Rand
- Released: 1953; 73 years ago
- Memory: Total random-access memory of 1024 words of 36 bits each (36 Williams tubes with a capacity of 1024 bits each)
- Weight: 38,543 pounds (19.3 short tons; 17.5 t)
- Predecessor: UNIVAC 1101
- Successor: UNIVAC 1103A

The UNIVAC 1103 or ERA 1103, a successor to the UNIVAC 1101, is a computer system designed by Engineering Research Associates and built by the Remington Rand corporation in October 1953. It was the first computer for which Seymour Cray was credited with design work.

== History ==
Even before the completion of the Atlas (UNIVAC 1101), the Navy asked Engineering Research Associates to design a more powerful machine. This project became Task 29, and the computer was designated Atlas II.

In 1952, Engineering Research Associates asked the Armed Forces Security Agency (the predecessor of the NSA) for approval to sell the Atlas II commercially. Permission was given, on the condition that several specialized instructions would be removed. The commercial version then became the UNIVAC 1103. Because of security classification, Remington Rand management was unaware of this machine before this. The first commercially sold UNIVAC 1103 was sold to the aircraft manufacturer Convair, where Marvin Stein worked with it.

Remington Rand announced the UNIVAC 1103 in February 1953. The machine competed with the IBM 701 in the scientific computation market. In early 1954, a committee of the Joint Chiefs of Staff requested that the two machines be compared for the purpose of using them for a Joint Numerical Weather Prediction project. Based on the trials, the two machines had comparable computational speed, with a slight advantage for IBM's machine, but the IBM 701 was favored unanimously for its significantly faster input/output equipment.

The successor machines are the UNIVAC 1103A or Univac Scientific, which improved upon the design by replacing the unreliable Williams tube memory with magnetic-core memory, adding hardware floating-point instructions, and perhaps the earliest occurrence of a hardware interrupt feature. That was succeeded by the UNIVAC 1105.

== Technical details ==
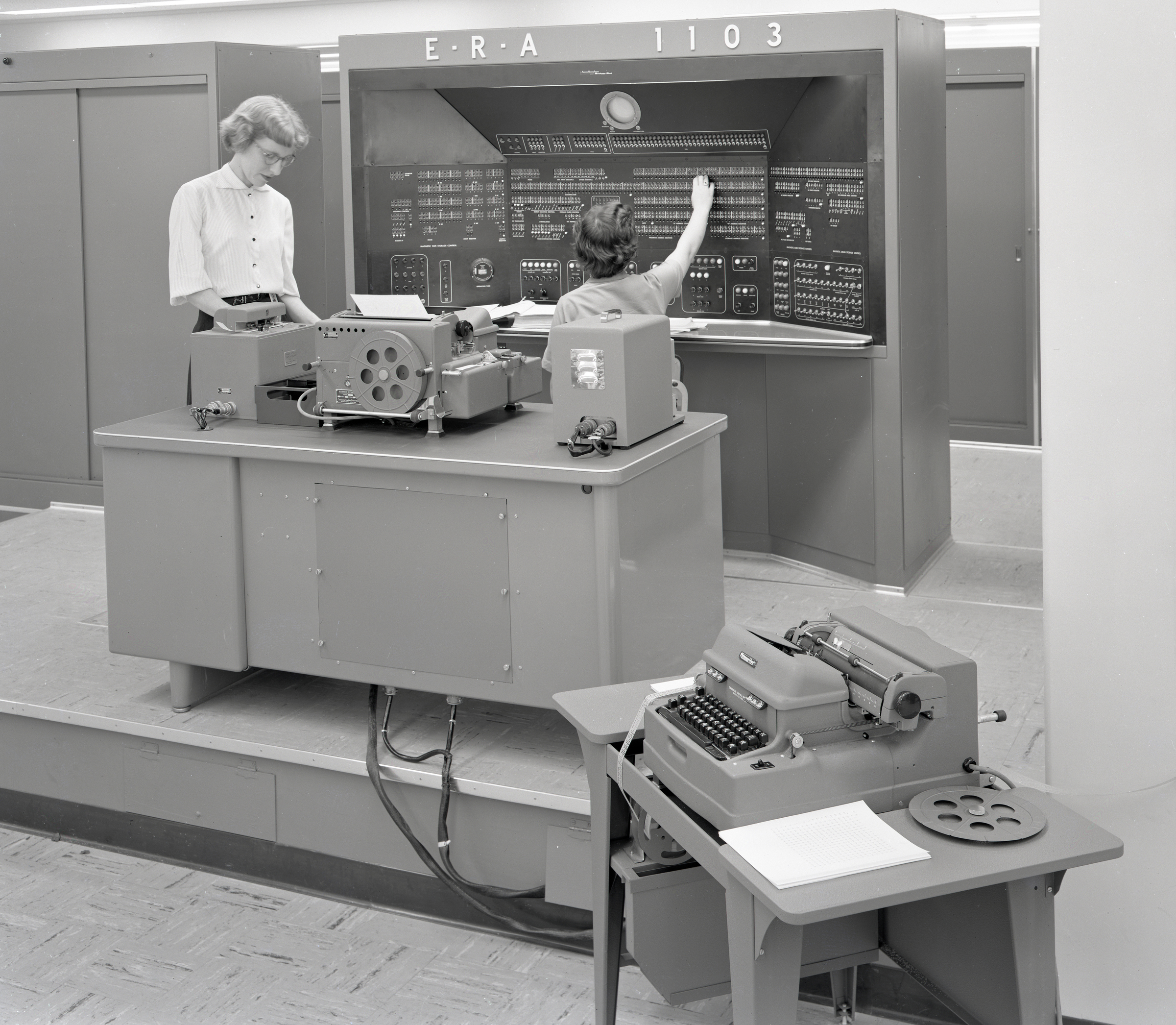
ERA 1103 Lewis Flight Propulsion Laboratory.

System logic was done with around 3,900 vacuum tubes (mostly triodes) and 9,000 diodes, in total at least 12 distinct tube types were used in the design. The system used electrostatic storage, consisting of 36 Williams tubes with a capacity of 1024 bits each, giving a total random-access memory of 1024 words of 36 bits each. Each of the 36 Williams tubes was 5 inches (130 mm) in diameter. A magnetic drum memory provided 16,384 words. Both the electrostatic and drum memories were directly addressable: addresses 0 through 01777 (Octal) were in electrostatic memory and 040000 through 077777 (Octal) were on the drum.

Fixed-point numbers had a 1-bit sign and a 35-bit value, with negative values represented in ones' complement format.

Instructions had a 6-bit operation code and two 15-bit operand addresses.

Programming systems for the machine included the RECO regional coding assembler by Remington-Rand, the RAWOOP one-pass assembler and SNAP floating-point interpretive system authored by the Ramo-Wooldridge Corporation of Los Angeles, the FLIP floating-point arithmetic interpretive system by Consolidated Vultee Aircraft of San Diego, and the CHIP floating-point interpretive system by Wright Field in Ohio.

The UNIVAC 1103/A weighed about 38,543 pounds (19.3 short tons; 17.5 t).

== 1103A ==
The UNIVAC 1103A or Univac Scientific is an upgraded version introduced in March 1956.

Significant new features on the 1103A were its magnetic-core memory and the addition of interrupts to the processor. The UNIVAC 1103A had up to 12,288 words of 36-bit magnetic-core memory, in one to three banks of 4,096 words each.

Fixed-point numbers had a one-bit sign and a 35-bit value, with negative values represented in ones' complement format. Floating-point numbers had a one-bit sign, an eight-bit characteristic, and a 27-bit mantissa. Instructions had a six-bit operation code and two 15-bit operand addresses.

The 1103A was contemporary with, and a competitor to, the IBM 704, which also employed vacuum-tube logic, magnetic-core memory, and floating-point hardware.

A version of this machine was sold to the Lewis Research Center, NACA (National Advisory Committee for Aeronautics) in Cleveland, Ohio. It had the first magnetic core of 1096 words of 36 bits. The magnetic drum storage had a capacity of 16,384 words, and the clock speed is 500kHz. Input/output is teletype style punched tape. When NACA became NASA in 1958, a series of improvements was begun to improve functionality and reliability. Over the next ten years, the machine was significantly upgraded by replacing the magnetic core with a commercial solid-state 16,384-word magnetic core system. An eight-unit magnetic tape system, a floating-point arithmetic unit, and an indirect addressing unit were designed and built in-house. All solid-state commercial electronics modules were interfaced to the vacuum tube electronics in the original machine.

== 1104 ==
The 1104 system is a 30-bit version of the 1103 built for Westinghouse Electric in 1957, for use on the BOMARC Missile Program. However, by the time the BOMARC was deployed in the 1960s, a more modern computer (a version of the AN/USQ-20, designated the G-40) had replaced the UNIVAC 1104.

== 1105 ==
The UNIVAC 1105 is a follow-on computer to the UNIVAC 1103A introduced by Sperry Rand in September 1958. The main changes from the 1103 included a buffered I/O system and an optional third memory cabinet extending core memory by an additional 4,096 words.

== See also ==
- UNIVAC 1100/2200 series
- List of UNIVAC products
- History of computing hardware
- List of vacuum-tube computers
