= Galimov =

Galimov is a surname of Tatar origin. Notable people with this surname include:

- Akim Galimov (born 1985), Ukrainian journalist
- Aleksandr Galimov (born 2000), Russian footballer
- Alexander Galimov (1985–2011), Russian ice hockey player
- Ansel Galimov (born 1991), Russian ice hockey player
- Artyom Galimov (born 1999), Russian ice hockey player
- Emil Galimov (born 1992), Russian ice hockey player
- Erik Galimov (1936–2020), Russian geochemist
- Marat Galimov (born 1964), Russian footballer
- Nail Galimov (1966–2024), Russian footballer
- Rais Galimov (born 1946), Russian sailor
- Stanislav Galimov (born 1988), Russian ice hockey player
