= Gerta Hüttl-Folter =

Austrian philologist (1923–2000)

- Born: Gerta Hüttl; 8 May 1923; Vienna, Austria
- Died: 18 January 2000 (aged 76); Vienna, Austria
- Occupation: Philologist
- Spouse: Dean S. Worth (m. 1954)
- Awards: Guggenheim Fellowship (1963)

Academic background
- Education: University of Vienna; University of Paris
- Doctoral advisor: André Mazon

Academic work
- Discipline: Philology
- Sub-discipline: 18th-century Russian philology
- Institutions: Tufts University; University of California, Los Angeles; University of Vienna

Gerta Hüttl-Folter (8 May 1923 – 18 January 2000) was an Austrian philologist. After obtaining her doctorate from the University of Paris, she moved to the United States and became a full professor at the University of California, Los Angeles, before becoming the first head of the University of Vienna Department of Russian Studies. A 1963 Guggenheim Fellow, she focused on 18th-century Russian philology, with her work including such books as Foreign Words in Russian (1963) and Die Trat/Torot-Lexeme in den Altrussischen Chroniken (1983).

== Biography ==
=== Early life and education ===
Hüttl was born on 8 May 1923 in Vienna. Her father, Heinrich Hüttl, was vice-president of the Federal Police, and she had Czech and South Slavic ancestry through her mother Franziska (née Netrwal) Hüttl. She graduated from a Realgymnasium with honours.

When Nazi Germany annexed Austria in 1938, her father was sent to Dachau concentration camp and the family lost their home; the noble family of Maria Razumovsky (a friend of hers from school) took her in to live in their residence Schloss Schönstein, where she became interested in Russian literature and culture. She studied Slavic languages and literature at the University of Vienna, obtaining her DPhil in 1946.

She saved their Institute of Slavic Philology's library from being stolen by Soviet forces. Her parents died due to World War II, and she worked as a secondary school teacher in Russian.

She moved out of Vienna due to sexism in academia, and she obtained her doctorat from the University of Paris in 1952, under the supervision of André Mazon. Her dissertation concluded that Vasily Trediakovsky was more influential in 18th-century Russian vocabulary than Nikolay Karamzin. It was published in 1956 and she won the Theodor Körner Prize in 1954 for a German translation of her dissertation.

She had a daughter in 1946 and she married linguist Dean S. Worth in 1954.

=== Academic career ===
After three years at Harvard University, as well as a year as a Russian instructor at Tufts University (1957), she moved to Los Angeles in 1957 and joined the University of California, Los Angeles, as an assistant professor of Slavic languages. She was promoted to associate professor in 1961 and full professor in 1965, though this had stalled due in part to anti-nepotism rules preventing spouses from working in the same department and what Nozsicska said were "obvious political considerations". She returned to the University of Vienna as their first head of their Department of Russian Studies, after rejecting the UCL School of Slavonic and East European Studies's offer of a full professor position. She served as co-editor of the Wiener Slavistisches Jahrbuch, as well as member of the Russian Linguistics editorial board.

She published several monographs on Russian studies, with her focus on 18th-century Russian philology before shifting towards the 17th century by 1983. In 1963, She was awarded a Guggenheim Fellowship "for studies of the historical development of secondary vocabularies in the Russian, Polish, and Serbocroatian languages", allowing her to head to the Soviet Union for research. In 1967, she briefly returned to the Institute for Slavic Philology as a Fulbright Lecturer.

=== Later life, death, and legacy ===
She retired from the university in 1993, and became professor emeritus. Even after her retirement, she was participating in seminars, including a 1999 commemorative conference on Slavic studies. Werner Lehfeldt called her "one of the most outstanding representatives of the science of the Russian language", noting that "Russian studies owes [her] many important contributions." BiografiA called her "one of the most important Slavic scholars in Austria".

Hüttl-Folter died in Vienna on 18 January 2000.

== Works ==
- Die Etymologie der russischen Tiernamen. Diss. Wien (1946)
- Die Bereicherung des russischen Wortschatzes im 18. Jahrhundert (1956)
- Paleosiberian Peoples and Languages: A Bibliographical Guide (1957, with Roman Jakobson and J. F. Beebe)
- Foreign Words in Russian: A Historical Sketch, 1550-1800 (1963) (Note: Reviews of this book:)
- Die Trat/Torot-Lexeme in den Altrussischen Chroniken: Ein Beitrag zur Vorgeschichte der Russischen Literatursprache (1983) (Note: Reviews of this book:)
- Syntaktische Studien zur neueren russischen Literatursprache (1996)
