= BiografiA. Lexikon österreichischer Frauen =

Biographical dictionary of Austrian women

BiographiA. Lexikon österreichischer Frauen
- Language: German
- Genre: Biographical dictionary
- Media type: 2016
- Pages: 1419
- ISBN: 9783205795902
- OCLC: 953945386

biografiA. biographische datenbank und lexikon österreichischer frauen (English: biografiA: Biographical Database and Encyclopedia of Austrian Women) is a biographical dictionary of historical and contemporary notable women of Austria. The German language open-access full text is available online.

The encyclopedia, edited by Ilse Korotin and published in 2016 by Böhlau Verlag in 4,280 pages over four printed volumes, contains around 6,500 biographies from Roman times to the present day. biografiA draws on unpublished earlier work by Erika Weinzierl and Ruth Aspöck.
