= UNIVAC 1105 =

Univac computer introduced in 1958

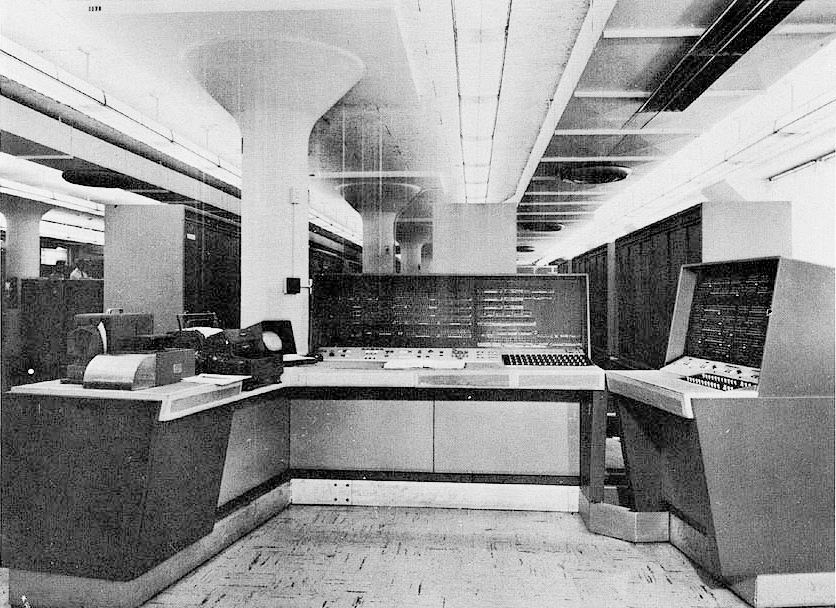
UNIVAC 1105 operator console, in front of the cabinets containing the CPU and memory.

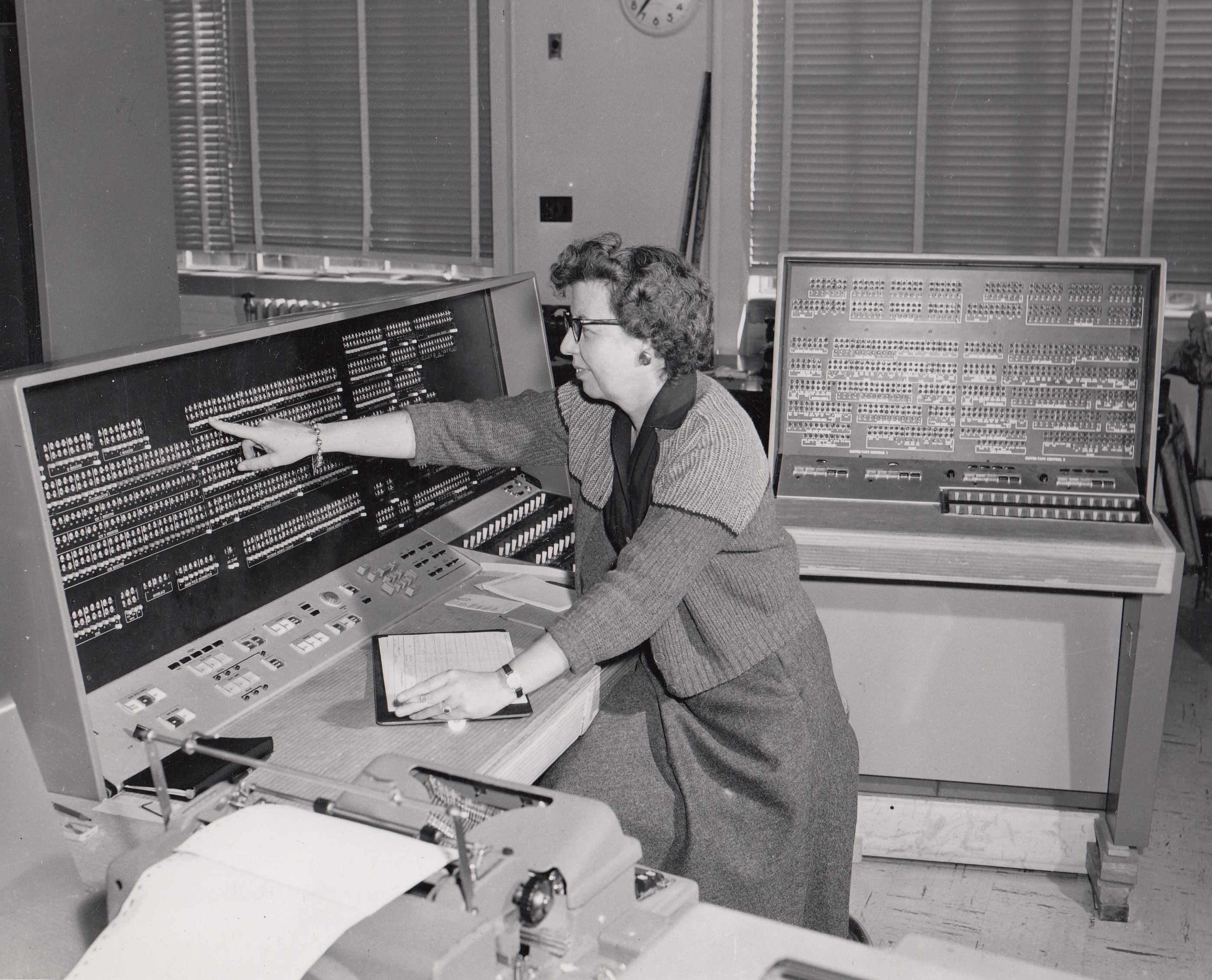
The U.S. Census Bureau used 1105s to process the 1960 census.

The UNIVAC 1105 was a follow-on computer to the UNIVAC 1103A introduced by Sperry Rand in September 1958. The UNIVAC 1105 used 21 types of vacuum tubes, 11 types of diodes, 10 types of transistors, and three core types.

The UNIVAC 1105 had either 8,192 or 12,288 words of 36-bit magnetic core memory, in two or three banks of 4,096 words each. Magnetic drum memory provided either 16,384 or 32,768 words, in one or two drums with 16,384 words each. Sixteen to twenty-four UNISERVO II tape drives were connected, with a maximum capacity (not counting block overhead) of 1,200,000 words per tape. Major differences from the 1103A were in the addition of a buffered Input/Output system consisting of two 120-word buffers which allowed for overlapping of magnetic tape reading with writing at the same time.

Fixed-point numbers had a one-bit sign and a 35-bit value, with negative values represented in ones' complement format. Floating-point numbers had a one-bit sign, an eight-bit characteristic, and a 27-bit mantissa. Instructions had a six-bit operation code and two 15-bit operand addresses.

A complete UNIVAC 1105 computer system required 160 kW of power (175 KVA, 0.9 power factor) and an air conditioning unit with a power of at least 35 tons (123 kW) for cooling input water. The computer system weighed about 57,089 pounds (28.5 short tons; 25.9 t) with a floor loading of 47 lb/ft^{2} (230 kg/m^{2}) and required a room 49 x 64 x 10 ft (15 x 20 x 3 m). The floor space for the computer was approximately 3,752 ft^{2} (350 m^{2}). The power, refrigeration and equipment room was approximately 2,450 ft^{2} (230 m^{2}).

== Cost, price and rental rates ==
Component	Cost	Monthly rental
Basic system, consisting of 8,192 words magnetic core, 16,384 words magnetic drum, central processor, peripheral control, and 16 Uniservo II	$1,932,000	$33,060
Additional equipment
4,096 words magnetic core	$195,000	$4,500
16,384 words magnetic drum	$60,000	$1,500
Floating point	$65,000	$1,545
Uniservo II	$20,000	$450
Card input-output	$55,000	$1,310
High speed printer	$185,000	$3,300

== Chapel Hill ==
In 1959, a Univac 1105 located in the basement of Phillips Hall of The University of North Carolina at Chapel Hill was one of three computers of its type. It was intended primarily for the United States Census Bureau, which had one of its own; Armour Institute of Technology had the other. The Chapel Hill unit cost $2.4 million, with the improvements to the basement, including 16-inch concrete walls to protect it from nuclear attack, added $1.2 million. Its memory was less than 50 kilobytes and it had the capability of adding 30,000 numbers per second. The Univac was 60 feet long, weighed 19 tons, and used 7200 vacuum tubes. Its printer had a speed of 600 lines per minute.

== See also ==
- UNIVAC 1100/2200 series
- List of UNIVAC products
- History of computing hardware
- List of vacuum tube computers
