= Amikam Aharoni =

Israeli physicist

- עמיקם אַהֲרֹֹנִי
- Amikam Aharoni in his office at the Weizmann Institute of Science, Rehovot, Israel.
- Born: 5 August 1929; Safed, Palestine
- Died: 21 January 2002 (aged 72); Rehovot, Israel
- Scientific career
- Fields: Magnetism
- Workplaces: Weizmann Institute

Amikam Aharoni (Hebrew: עמיקם אַהֲרֹֹנִי; 5 August 1929 – 21 January 2002) was an Israeli physicist who has made numerous contributions to the fields of magnetism. He is the author of over a hundred works, with his research of ferromagnetism being most accredited.

== Education ==
Born in Safed, Aharoni received a M.A. in physics from Hebrew University in 1953 and a Ph.D. in physics from the Weizmann Institute in 1957. His thesis was on magnetoresistive memory elements. His postdoc work with John Bardeen took him to the University of Illinois during 1958-1959. In 1971-1972, 1977–1978, and 1992 he was a senior research fellow in the Department of Metallurgy at the University of Oxford. In 1972 he was promoted to professor in the Department of Electronics at Weizmann Institute, and in 1978 he was appointed the Richard Kronstein Professor of Theoretical Magnetism.

== Research ==
His research significantly advanced the theoretical understanding of magnetic phenomena.

Aharoni's work on micromagnetics and the phenomenological theory of ferromagnets provided deep insights into the behavior of magnetic materials

Aharoni's 1996 book, "Introduction to the Theory of Ferromagnetism" has been described as an authoritative introduction to micromagnetism.

== Private life ==
Aharoni's mother was a school teacher, and third-generation Israeli. His father was a teacher of mathematics (and distinguished chess master) who had emigrated from Russia, arriving in Israel in 1920. The family was religious, and Aharoni was able to recite from memory passages from both the bible and the talmud of considerable length.

In 1947, Aharoni's studies were disrupted by Israel's War of Independence. Aharoni joined the "Students' Brigade" and was deployed in and around Jerusalem, taking part in numerous actions during the city's 1947–1948 siege.

At the Weizmann Institute, Aharoni met his wife Henia, and the two were married in 1955. The couple had three sons and, in time, nine grandchildren. Aharoni formally retired in 1994.

== Awards ==
Distinguished Lecturer of the IEEE Magnetics Society of 1993.

== See also ==
- Anthony Schuyler Arrott
