= Jack Goldman =

American physicist (1921–2011)

Jacob E. Goldman
- Born: July 18, 1921
- Died: December 20, 2011 (aged 90)
- Education: University of Pennsylvania (PhD)
- Scientific career
- Fields: Physics
- Doctoral advisor: Frederick Seitz
- Doctoral students: Anthony Schuyler Arrott

Jacob E. "Jack" Goldman (July 18, 1921 – December 20, 2011) was an American physicist and former chief scientist of Xerox Corporation. He was also a faculty member at Carnegie Tech and directed the Ford Scientific Laboratory. He is especially notable for hiring physicist Dr. George Pake to create the Xerox Palo Alto Research Center, which produced many seminal ideas in modern computing.

Goldman was born in Brooklyn, New York, and died in Westport, Connecticut.

Among the projects that Goldman worked on at Ford in the 1960s was the sodium–sulfur battery for electric cars. After narrowly surviving a fiery crash of his gasoline-powered Lincoln, Goldman quipped "I guess I proved gasoline is more dangerous than a sodium–sulfur battery."

Jack Goldman died from congestive heart failure on December 20, 2011.

== See also ==
- Jacob Goldman (Prison Rabbi)
