= Ilse Korotin =

Austrian philosopher and sociologist (born 1957)

Ilse Erika Korotin (born 1957 in Horn, Lower Austria) is an Austrian philosopher and sociologist. She researched and published on the history of ideas of Nazism. At the Institute for Science and Art in Vienna, she heads the Documentation Centre for Women's Studies. Her work focuses on feminist biographical research and history of science.

== Life and work ==
Ilse Korotin completed an apprenticeship as a bookseller. After several years of professional activity, she studied philosophy and sociology at the University of Vienna from 1983. In 1990, she received her doctorate in philosophy, and since then she has been working at the Vienna Institute for Science and Art, since 1991 as head of the Documentation Centre for Women's Studies.

The documentation, research and networking project biografiA. biographische datenbank und lexikon österreichischer frauen has been carried out under Korotin's direction since 1998. It is dedicated to the historical-biographical processing of Austrian women's personalities from the time when Austria was first mentioned until the present day with the aim of providing a sound basis for further research in the field of feminist historical research, history of science, as well as women's and gender studies. The results of the work are published in a book series and made available in a database that is constantly updated.

As part of the project, Ilse Korotin, together with Brigitta Keintzel from the University of Vienna, published the lexical reference work Wissenschafterinnen in und aus Österreich. Leben - Werk - Wirken (Women Scientists in and from Austria: Life and Work) in 2002. It comprises the life stories of 342 women scientists from all areas of the cultural and natural sciences from the turn of the century to the post-war period, including several women scientists who were murdered in German concentration camps. The encyclopedia also shows that "until well into the second half of the 20th century, very few women were able to succeed in the institutionalized science business. Habilitations and appointments as professors remained exceptions." The large number of biographies speaks for a broad emancipation movement, the editors write in the foreword, and call for a "fundamental revision of the previous view of Austrian scientific history."

On 20 May 2016 the biographiA. Lexikon österreichischer Frauen edited by Ilse Korotin was presented to the public by President Heinz Fischer in the rooms of the Presidential Chancellery. The four-volume encyclopedia, which was described by Federal President Fischer during the presentation event as an "important and voluminous new publication in terms of subject matter and thoroughness", contains around 6,500 biographies of Austrian women or references to women's biographical traces from Roman times to the present day - including the year of birth 1938 - and is related to a sphere of activity within the geographical borders of present-day Austria. It shows the work of women in politics, society, culture and history, thus entering new biographical territory in many areas and opening up new research perspectives. It is part of the documentation, research and networking project biografiA. biographische datenbank und lexikon österreichischer frauen at the Institute for Science and Art.

== Awards ==
In 2017, Korotin was awarded the Prize of the City of Vienna for popular education.

== Bibliography ==
Monograph

- "Am Muttergeist soll die Welt genesen". Philosophische Dispositionen zum Frauenbild im Nationalsozialismus, Böhlau Verlag, Wien/Köln/Weimar 1992, ISBN 3-205-05476-8

Edited books and chapter contributions

- Die besten Geister der Nation. Philosophie und Nationalsozialismus, Picus Verlag, Wien 1994, ISBN 3-85452-257-6
- With Charlotte Kohn-Ley: Der feministische "Sündenfall"? Antisemitische Vorurteile in der Frauenbewegung (=Dokumentation eines Symposiums des Jüdischen Instituts für Erwachsenenbildung in Wien), Picus Verlag, Wien 1994, ISBN 3-85452-261-4
  - darin: "Die mythische Weiblichkeit eines Volkes". J.J. Bachofen, das Mutterrecht und der Nationalsozialismus, S. 84–130
- With Volker Eickhoff: Sehnsucht nach Schicksal und Tiefe. Der Geist der konservativen Revolution, Picus Verlag, Wien 1997, ISBN 3-85452-406-4
  - darin: Die politische Radikalisierung der Geschlechterdifferenz im Kontext von "konservativer Revolution" und Nationalsozialismus. Mathilde Ludendorff und der "Völkische Feminismus", S. 105–127
- Gebrochene Kontinuitäten? Zur Rolle und Bedeutung des Geschlechterverhältnisses in der Entwicklung des Nationalsozialismus, Studienverlag, Innsbruck/Wien/München 2000, ISBN 3-7065-1398-6
- With Brigitta Keintzel: Wissenschafterinnen in und aus Österreich. Leben – Werk – Wirken, Böhlau, Wien/Köln/Weimar 2002, ISBN 3-205-99467-1, Open Access
- Österreichische Bibliothekarinnen auf der Flucht. Verfolgt, verdrängt, vergessen?, Praesens Verlag, Wien 2007, ISBN 978-3-7069-0408-7
- "Die Zivilisation ist nur eine ganz dünne Decke ..." Ella Lingens (1908–2002), Ärztin – Widerstandskämpferin – Zeugin der Anklage, Praesens Verlag, Wien 2011, ISBN 978-3-7069-0646-3
- Mit Susanne Blumesberger: Frauenbiografieforschung. Theoretische Diskurse und methodologische Konzepte, Praesens Verlag, Wien 2012, ISBN
- With Christine Kanzler and Karin Nusko: "... den Vormarsch dieses Regimes einen Millimeter aufgehalten zu haben ...": Österreichische Frauen im Widerstand gegen den Nationalsozialismus, Praesens Verlag, Wien 2015, ISBN 978-3-7069-0434-6
- biografiA. Lexikon österreichischer Frauen (four volumes), Böhlau Verlag, Wien/Köln/Weimar 2016, ISBN 978-3-205-79590-2
- Deutsche Philosophen aus der Sicht des Sicherheitsdienstes des Reichsführers SS – Schwerpunkt Österreich, in: Marion Heinz et al. (Hrsg.): Philosophie und Zeitgeist im Nationalsozialismus, Verlag Königshausen & Neumann, Würzburg 2006, ISBN 978-3-8260-3298-1, S. 45–67
- Deutsche Philosophen aus der Sicht des Sicherheitsdienstes des Reichsführers SS – Dossier Ernst Mally, in: Carsten Klingemann (Hrsg.): Jahrbuch für Soziologiegeschichte, VS Verlag für Sozialwissenschaften 2007, ISBN 978-3-531-15273-8, S. 167–175, doi:10.1007/978-3-531-90494-8 7
  - and further dossiers in the 1993 Yearbooks for the History of Sociology: doi:10.1007/978-3-322-97304-7 12;

1994 und 1995: doi:10.1007/978-3-322-99766-1 16;
1997/98: doi:10.1007/978-3-322-99644-2 14
