= Anthony Schuyler Arrott =

Canadian physicist (1928–2024)

Anthony Arrott
- Born: April 1, 1928; Pittsburgh, Pennsylvania, U.S.
- Died: February 29, 2024 (aged 95); Burnaby, British Columbia, Canada
- Education: Carnegie Institute of Technology
- Known for: Arrott plot
- Spouse: Patricia Graham (m. 1953–2016; her death)
- Scientific career
- Fields: Physics
- Workplaces: Simon Fraser University
- Doctoral advisor: Jacob E. Goldman

Anthony Schuyler Arrott (April 1, 1928 – February 29, 2024) was an American-born Canadian physicist, and a professor at Carnegie Institute of Technology and Simon Fraser University. He was a specialist in condensed matter physics, the physics of magnetism, and liquid crystals. He was the author of over 200 scientific papers. Arrott is the subject of the 2020 documentary Portrait, directed by Lily Ekimian and A.T. Ragheb.

== Early work ==
Arrott wrote his PhD thesis at the Carnegie Institute of Technology on the magnetic properties of Nickel alloys.

After working at Carnegie Tech from 1953 to 1956, he joined the physics department of the Ford Scientific Laboratory in Dearborn, Michigan, where he studied the magnetic properties of iron alloys.

== Research area ==
In 1957, he suggested a straightforward criterion for ferromagnetism from observations of magnetic isotherms. This method was called Arrott plots. In collaboration with Murray J. Press, he gave a description of surface singularities in liquid-crystal droplets. A lot of works are devoted to the properties of ferromagnetic samples (for example the so-called Arrott's cylinder) with micrometer and sub-micrometer sizes. Commissioned in 1978, Arrott designed the Thermal Neutron Facility at the TRIUMF cyclotron.

== Death ==
Arrott died in Burnaby, British Columbia, Canada on February 29, 2024, at the age of 95. He was preceded in death by his wife Patricia in 2016, she was a notable visual artist.

Arrott and his wife's artwork were subject of a documentary film, Portrait (2020) directed by Ahmed T. Ragheb, and Lily Ekimian Ragheb of Studio Ragheb.

== Recognition ==
- 1951: Allis-Chalmers Fellowship in Magnetism
- 1963: Guggenheim Fellowship in Physics
- 1982: Gold Medal for Physical Sciences from the Science Council of British Columbia
- 1986: Medal for Lifetime Achievement in Physics from the Canadian Association of Physicists

== See also ==
- Amikam Aharoni
