= Memory mapping =

In computing, memory mapping may refer to:

- Memory-mapped file, also known as mmap()
- Memory-mapped I/O, an alternative to port I/O; a communication between CPU and peripheral device using the same instructions, and same bus, as between CPU and memory
- Virtual memory, technique which gives an application program the impression that it has contiguous working memory, while in fact it is physically fragmented and may even overflow on to disk storage

== See also ==
- Port-mapped I/O, a method complementary to Memory-mapped I/O
