= Dolní Životice =

- Municipality
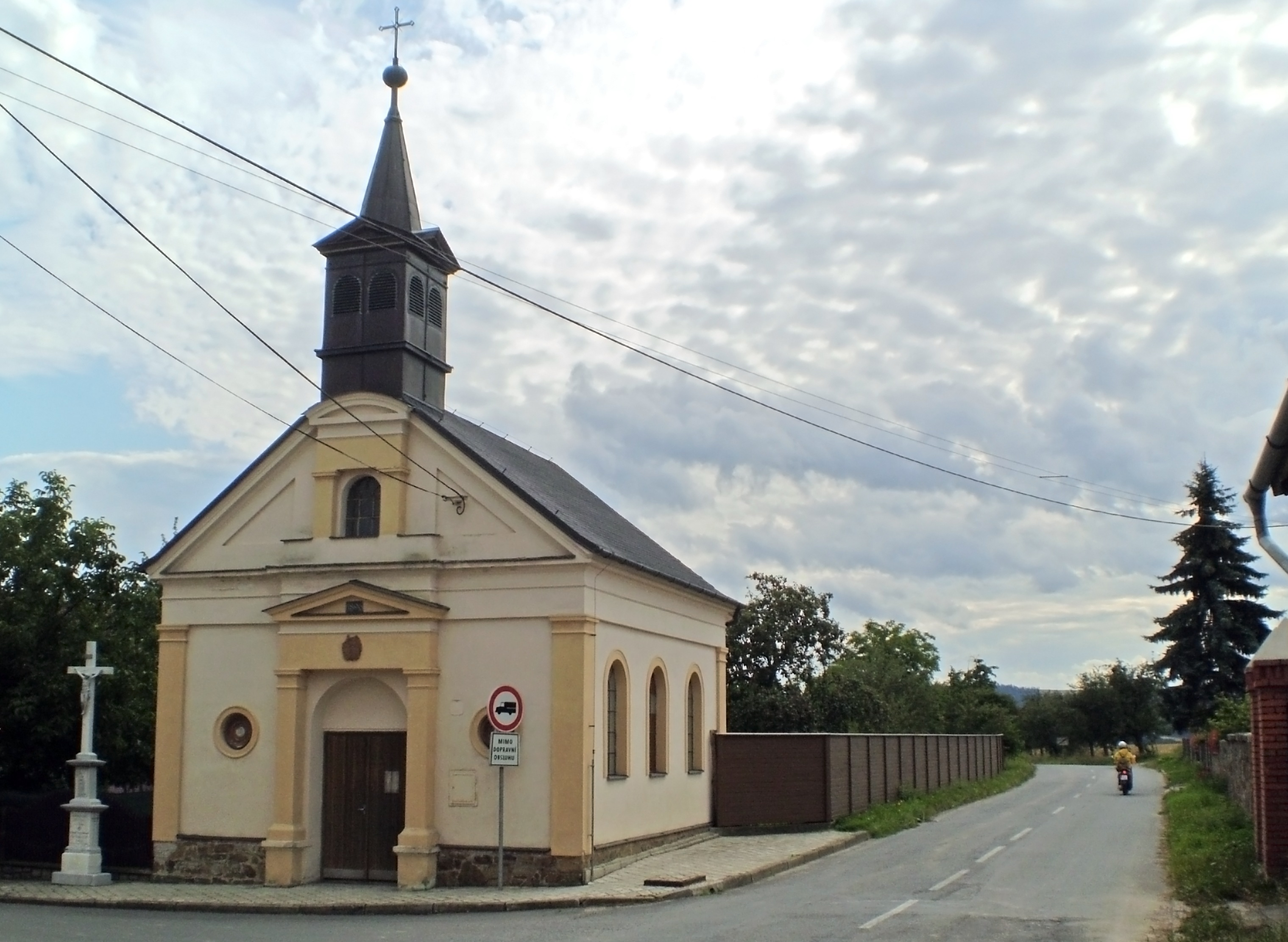
- Chapel in Hertice

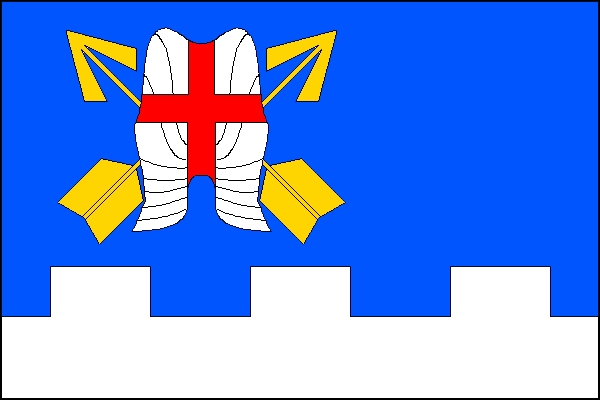
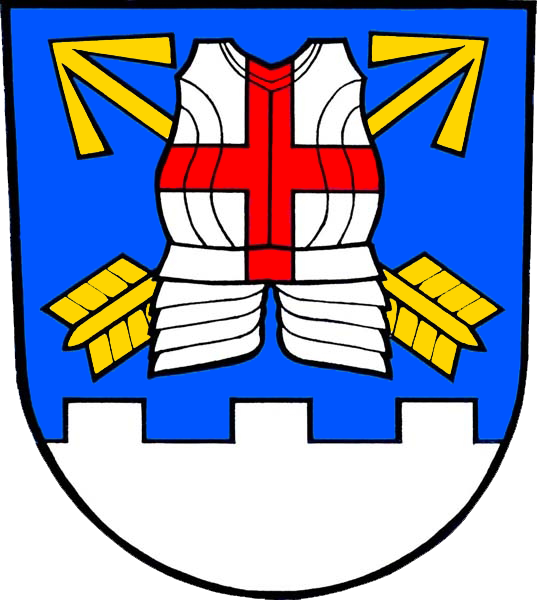
- Flag Coat of arms

- Location in the Czech Republic
- Coordinates: 49°53′50″N 17°46′47″E
- Country: Czech Republic
- Region: Moravian-Silesian
- District: Opava
- First mentioned: 1320

Area
  - Total: 11.26 km^{2} (4.35 sq mi)
- Elevation: 299 m (981 ft)

Population (2026-01-01)
  - Total: 1,030
  - Density: 91.5/km^{2} (237/sq mi)
- Time zone: UTC+1 (CET)
  - Summer (DST): UTC+2 (CEST)
- Postal code: 747 56
- Website: www.dolnizivotice.cz

Dolní Životice (German: Schönstein) is a municipality and village in Opava District in the Moravian-Silesian Region of the Czech Republic. It has about 1,000 inhabitants.

== Administrative division ==
Dolní Životice consists of two municipal parts (in brackets population according to the 2021 census):

- Dolní Životice (918)
- Hertice (115)

== History ==
The first written mention of Dolní Životice is from 1320. The first written mention of Hertice is from 1251.

== Demographics ==
Historical population
Year	Pop.	±%
1869	938	—
1880	937	−0.1%
1890	966	+3.1%
1900	970	+0.4%
1910	949	−2.2%
1921	1,067	+12.4%
1930	972	−8.9%
1950	837	−13.9%
1961	971	+16.0%
1970	877	−9.7%
1980	871	−0.7%
1991	871	+0.0%
2001	1,107	+27.1%
2011	1,090	−1.5%
2021	1,033	−5.2%
Source: Censuses
