= Akim Galimov =

Ukrainian journalist (born 1985)

- Акім Галімов
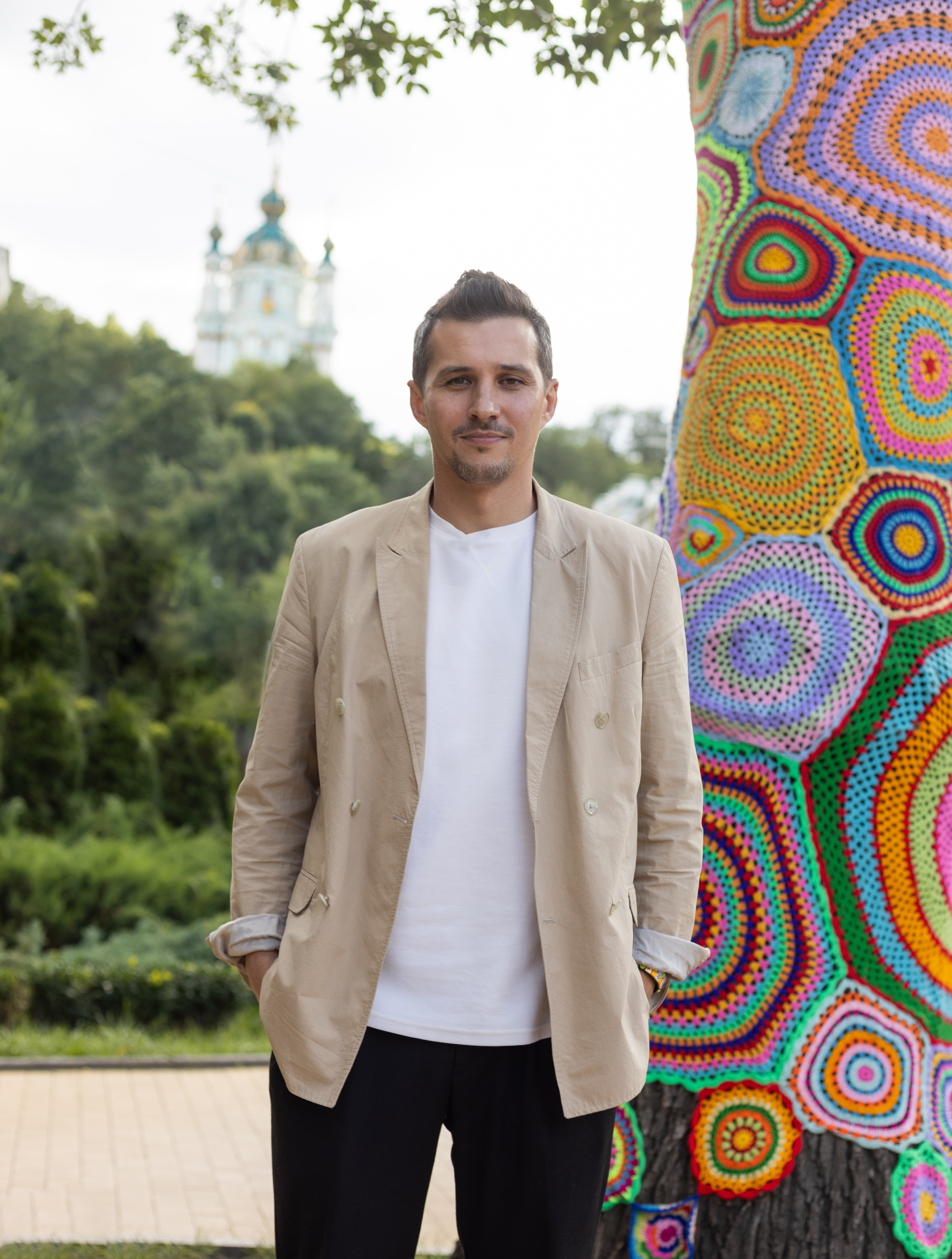
- Born: Akim Alfadovych Galimov; May 28, 1985 (age 40); Pogranichny, RSFSR
- Citizenship: Crimean Tatar
- Awards: Order of Merit

Akim Alfadovych Galimov (Crimean Tatar: Akim Ğalimov, Ukrainian: Акім Альфадович Галімов; born 28 May 1985, Pogranichny, RSFSR) is a Ukrainian journalist, screenwriter, producer, author of documentary and historical projects.

== Biography ==
By nationality, he is a Crimean Tatar (on his mother's side). In 1944, his grandfather was deported from Crimea. Akim's family was able to return to the peninsula from Uzbekistan only in 1994.

He graduated from the Faculty of Journalism of the Sevastopol branch of the Lomonosov Moscow State University. He worked for the Ukrainian TV channels Inter, Pershyi Natsionalnyi, and now 1+1.

== Works ==
=== Films ===
- Forced to War (2008)
- Operation Crimea (2014)
- ATM Woman (2014)
- Gypsy Blood (2015)
- Where does Ukraine begin? (2015)
- Ukraine. Return of its history (2016, 2017)
- Treasures of the Nation (2019, from the series "Ukraine. Return of its history")
- Secrets of Great Ukrainians (2021)
- Mysterious Manuscripts (2021, from the series "Ukraine. Recovering its History")
- Ukrainian palaces. The Golden Age (2022)
- The Real Story of Akim Galimov (2022)
- Evacuation (2023)
- Rashism. A medical history (2023)
- Ukraine of the future. To beat the aggressor (2023)

== Awards ==
- Order of Merit, 3rd class (28 June 2024)
- Order of Merit, 2nd class (1 April 2026)
- National Television Award of Ukraine "Teletriumf" winner in the nomination "Reporter" (2010)
- National Television Award of Ukraine "Teletriumf" winner in the nomination "Television Documentary" - for the film "Operation Crimea" (2015)
- National Television Award of Ukraine "Teletriumf" winner in the nomination "Television Documentary" - for the film "Ukraine. Return of its history" (2017)
- National Television Award of Ukraine "Teletriumf" winner in the nomination "Television Documentary" - for the film "Ukraine. Return of its history - 2" (2018)
- National Television Award of Ukraine "Teletriumf" winner in the nomination "Producer/Production Team of a Documentary Film/Series/Project" - for the film "Ukraine. Return of its history-2" (2018)

== See also ==
- Gregor Razumovsky (activist)
