= Werner Lehfeldt =

German Slavist

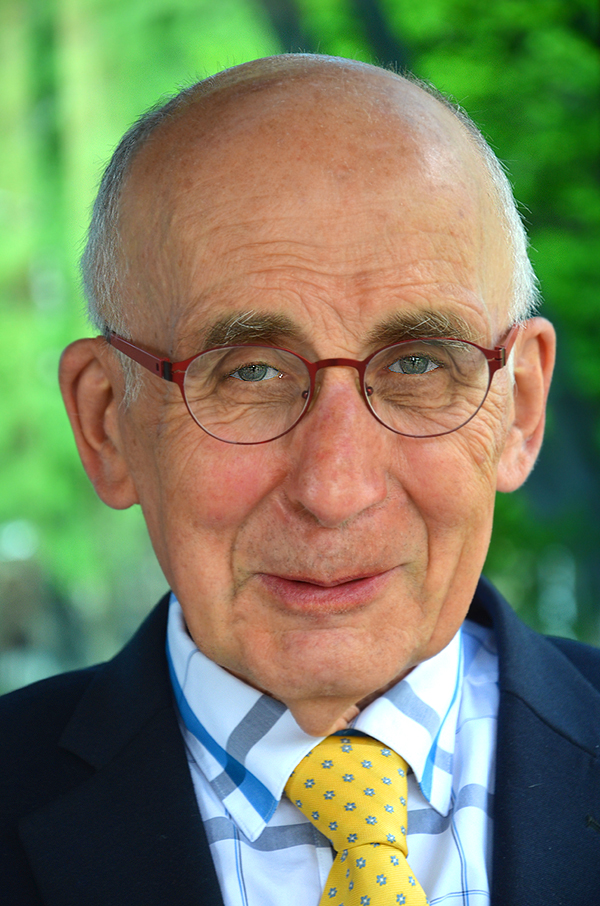
Werner Lehfeldt

Werner Lehfeldt (born 22 May 1943, Perleberg) is a German Slavist.

Lehfeldt attended primary school Goethe-Oberschule in Perleberg and after the escape from East Germany, from 1960 to 1962 the Ostseegymnasium in Timmendorfer Strand, where he graduated in 1962. From 1962, he studied Slavic Studies at the Universities of Mainz, Hamburg, Sarajevo and Bochum, receiving a degree in Bochum in 1967 in Slavic Studies and history. He continued to work there the same year as a researcher. In 1973 he habilitated in Bochum and in 1976 was appointed as the Chair in the Department of Slavic Linguistics at the University of Konstanz. In 1980 he declined an offer from the University of Hamburg and also in 1991 as a professor at the University of Geneva, where he taught as a guest professor for one semester. Between 1979 and 1989 he taught for ten semesters at the University of Basel. In 1991 he finally took a position at the University of Göttingen, where he led the Department of Slavic Philology from April 1992 until his retirement on 30 September 2011.

Since 1992 he was a corresponding member of the Croatian Academy of Arts and Sciences. Since 1994 he was a member of the Akademie gemeinnütziger Wissenschaften in Erfurt, and since 2011 a member of the Brunswick Scientific Society. On 9 February 1996 he became a full member of Philology and History class of the Göttingen Academy of Sciences and Humanities. On 1 April 2006 to 31 March 2012 he became a chairman of this class and a vice president of the Academy. On 28 October 2010 he received an honorary degree from the Moscow Institute of Russian Language by the Russian Academy of Sciences. On 19 April 2012 he received an honorary degree by the University of Kazan.

Since 1983 Lehfeldt was a co-editor of the journal Russian Linguistics, from 1993 to 2006 a leading co-editor and an editor-in-chief.

His main research areas include:

- comparative morphology of Slavic languages
- diachronic and synchronic accentology of Slavic languages
- morphosyntax of Russian
- history of Russian and Serbo-Croatian
- quantitative phonology
- linguistic typology
- history of science.

== Bibliography ==
- Das serbokroatische Aljamiado-Schrifttum der bosnisch-hercegovinischen Muslime. Transkriptionsprobleme. München 1969. (thesis).
- (with Gabriel Altmann) Allgemeine Sprachtypologie - Prinzipien und Meßverfahren. München 1973.
- Formenbildung des russischen Verbs - Versuch einer analytisch-synthetisch-funktionellen Beschreibung der Präsens- und der Präteritumflexion. München 1978.
- (with Gabriel Altmann) Einführung in die quantitative Phonologie. Bochum 1980.
- Eine Sprachlehre von der Hohen Pforte - Ein arabisch-persisch-griechisch-serbisches Gesprächslehrbuch vom Hofe des Sultans aus dem 15. Jahrhundert als Quelle für die Geschichte der serbischen Sprache. Köln 1989.
- Einführung in die morphologische Konzeption der slavischen Akzentologie. München 1993 (3. Auflage 2009).
- (with Peter Schmidt) KONGRUENZ - REKTION - ADJUNKTION. Systematische und historische Untersuchungen zur allgemeinen Morphosyntax und zu den Wortfügungen (slovosočetanija) im Russischen. München 1995.
- Einführung in die Sprachwissenschaft für Slavisten. München 1995 (2nd. edition 1996).
- Die altrussischen Inschriften des Hildesheimer Enkolpions. Göttingen 1999.
- Eine serbisch-russische Sprachbegegnung vom Anfang des XVI. Jahrhunderts. Göttingen 2000.
- Juraj Ratkaj Velikotaborskis "Kripozti Ferdinanda II." im Vergleich mit ihrer lateinischen Vorlage. Göttingen 2002.
- Sprjaženie ukrainskogo i russkogo glagolov i morfologičeskaja tipologija slavjanskich jazykov. Moskau 2002.
- Akzent und Betonung im Russischen. München 2003. (2006 Russian edition)
- Akcent i udarenie v sovremennom russkom jazyke. Moskau 2010.
- Carl Friedrich Gauß und die russische Sprache. Berlin 2011.
- Festschrift für Werner Lehfeldt zum 60. Geburtstag. München 2003.
- Poklon. Werner Lehfeldt zur Emeritierung. Göttingen 2011.
