= Kenneth Case =

American physicist and mathematician

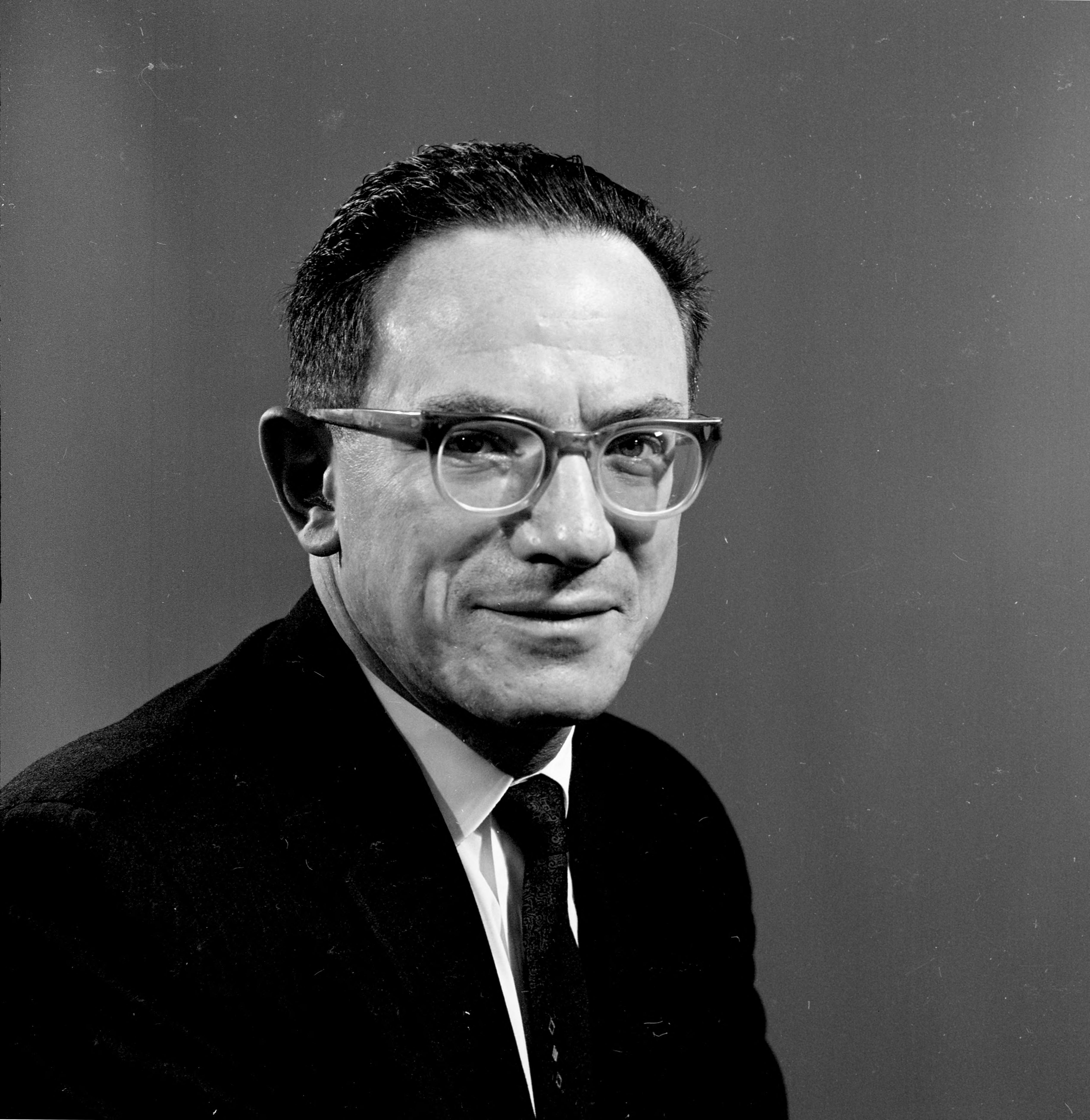
Case in 1965

Kenneth Myron Case (September 23, 1923 – February 1, 2006) was an American physicist and applied mathematician, best known for his use of the mathematical methods of quantum field theory (as developed in the 1940s) and transport theory (in part from the Manhattan Project) to a wide range of applied problems, especially many relevant to U.S. national security. He was an early member of the JASON advisory group.

== Early life and education ==
Case was born in Brooklyn, New York, and grew up in Manhattan. His father was a successful businessman who owned a paint manufacturing company. His mother was from an affluent family of German-Austrian Jews. Case, under the original family name Cassoff, attended the Ethical Culture School and then Fieldston. When he was in high school, his parents changed the family name to Case in the belief that this would improve their son's prospects. Ken was accepted for undergraduate studies at Harvard and matriculated in 1941, exempted from the World War II draft by extreme nearsightedness.

== Manhattan Project ==
In 1943, Case was one of several Harvard physics undergraduates who relocated to Los Alamos, New Mexico, to work on an undisclosed project—the Manhattan Project. He soon came under the influence of J. Robert Oppenheimer and was also working alongside other well-known physicists. Case developed new methods for calculating neutron transport and for estimating the explosive yield of bomb designs.

== Completion of education ==
After the war, back at Harvard, Case completed his undergraduate degree and subsequently began graduate work under Julian Schwinger, earning his Ph.D. in 1948. He was then awarded a fellowship at the Institute for Advanced Study in Princeton, where Oppenheimer was now director. Case's two years work at IAS on fundamental problems in field theory produced little of lasting importance, in part because of his insistence on using his mentor Schwinger's difficult formalism rather than the equivalent formalism of Feynman which was much more widely adopted by physicists.

== Career ==
After an additional postdoctoral year at the University of Rochester, Case in 1951 accepted a faculty position at the University of Michigan, there turning from fundamental physics to the application of deep mathematics to applied problems, initially plasma waves and related transport theory. (For the latter, he became a consultant to General Atomics in San Diego.) This work continued for about a decade, culminating in a 1960 paper that was subsequently cited more than 500 times.

In 1961, Case was invited to join the JASON advisory group, a group of scientists who met for six weeks every summer to advise the U.S. government on technical problems in national security. Case's involvement with JASON became a focal point of his work, often leading to efforts, some publishable but others classified, that continued beyond the JASON summer gathering. JASON reports in the 1960s through 1980s on topics close to Case's expertise include many on nonlinear wave phenomena in plasmas, and in underwater acoustic and turbulent phenomena. Case was reportedly a part of the informal "JASON Navy", a subset of the group who worked for the U.S. Navy on highly classified issues relating to U.S. missile submarine security. Other JASON Navy members included Walter Munk, Edward Frieman, William Nierenberg, and Curtis Callan.

Case's changed academic affiliations in 1969, when he moved to Rockefeller University in an arrangement that also made him a frequent presence in Princeton at IAS. He was elected to the National Academy of Sciences in 1975.

== Retirement and death ==
He retired from Rockefeller in 1988 and, with his wife Pat, moved to La Jolla, California, where he held an adjunct faculty position at UCSD until his death in 2006 at age 82.
