= Gregor Razumovsky (activist) =

Austrian of Russian and Ukrainian descent, count (born 1965)

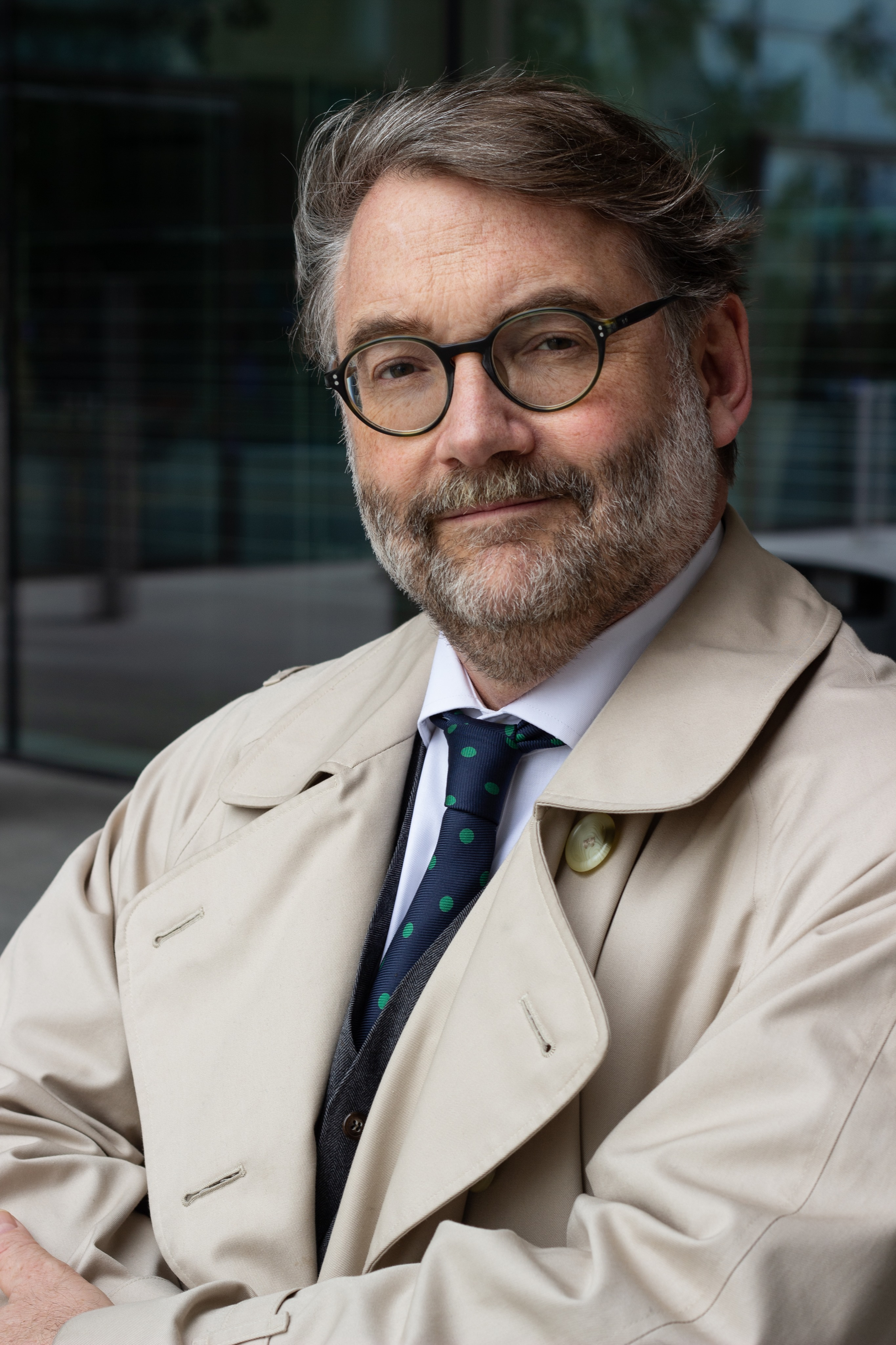
Gregor Rozumovsky

Gregor Razumovsky, also known as Hryhorii Rozumovskyi (German: Gregor Razumovsky von Wigstein, Ukrainian: Ґреґор Розумовський; born 3 March 1965) is an Austrian historian, political, public and cultural figure of Ukrainian descent, count. President of the Club for European Understanding and Communication in Vienna (2020), honorary member of the Galician Music Society (2020). Razumovsky is the head of the Razumovsky family since 26 July 2002.

== Biography ==
Gregor Razumovsky was born on 3 March 1965 in Giessen, West Germany, to Count Andreas Razumovsky (1929–2002) and Countess Dorothea Razumovska, Princess Solms-Hogenzolms-Lich (1935–2014). He is a direct descendant of Hetman Kyrylo Rozumovskyi, a Ukrainian monarch and duke, the last ruler of Ukraine before the annexation by the Russian Empire. In 1985–1987, Razumovsky served in the Armed Forces of Germany.

In 1991, he visited Ukraine for the first time. At that time, he took part in the rallies of the People's Movement of Ukraine on Khreshchatyk and met Viacheslav Chornovil and Levko Lukianenko. Since then, he has been coming to Kyiv and Baturyn regularly. In 2018, he donated to the museum in Baturyn the original wagon of Hetman Kyrylo Rozumovsky from 1763 from his family collection. He worked in Central and Southeastern Europe (1995–2000), in particular at the Institute for the Danube Region and Central Europe (1 998–2000, IDM); as a press secretary for the St. Pölten Theater (2001), and as a correspondent for the Enlargement Information Unit of the Directorate-General for Enlargement of the European Union in Austria (2001–2006).

In 2019, he acted as an expert and one of the characters in Akim Halimov's film "Treasures of the Nation" from the series "Ukraine. Return of its history".

In 2020, he founded the Club for European Understanding and Communication on the basis of the European Institute for Democracy (1999) and the Razumovsky Society for Art and Culture (2002).

Since the late 1980s, he has been actively defending and promoting Ukrainian interests in Western European socio-political circles. He is a specialist in countering propaganda and disinformation, has worked in international political information campaigns and is considered one of the leading analysts in the field of communications and information flows in the German-speaking EU countries. He is the initiator of the online project against Russian propaganda "The Reality Bites Initiative".

After the start of the full-scale Russian invasion of Ukraine in 2022, Gregor Razumovsky became the founder, co-author, and host of the Power of Reason YouTube project to combat Russian fakes.
