= Ruth Aspöck =

Austrian novelist

Ruth Aspöck (born 7 February 1947 in Salzburg) is an Austrian writer who lives in Vienna.

== Biography ==
She studied drama and Germanic language and literature in Vienna and Linz, and completed her studies with journeys to Cuba among other countries. She founded a feminist magazine in Vienna called Auf.

== Works ==
- Der ganze Zauber nennt sich Wissenschaft (1982)
- Emma oder Die Mühen der Architektur. Die Geschichte einer Frau aus Wien (1987)
- Ausnahmezustand für Anna (1992)
- Wo die Armut wohnt. (1992)
- Tremendo swing. Die achtziger Jahre in Kuba (1997)
- Gedichtet. Prosaische Lyrik (1995)
- Muttersöhnchenmärchen (1996)
- (S)Trickspiel (2003)
- Kannitverstan (2005)
