= Marvin Stein (computer scientist) =

Jewish American mathematician

Marvin Stein (1924-2015) was an American mathematician and computer scientist, and the "father of computer science" at the University of Minnesota.

== Early life ==
Marvin Stein was born in Cleveland, Ohio in 1924 to Russian-Jewish immigrants. The family later moved to Los Angeles, California to treat Stein's mother's tuberculosis. He graduated from Theodore Roosevelt High School in 1941, and immediately entered University of California, Los Angeles. His studies were interrupted and in 1942 he served in the US Army Signal Corps as a tabulating machine operator, and had a short stint working at IBM. He returned to school after the war and graduated from UCLA in 1947.

Stein did his Ph.D. at the Institute for Numerical Analysis at UCLA (or INA, an ancestor of UCLA's computer science department), where in the summer of 1949 he participated in a seminar on solving linear equations and finding eigenvalues and eigenvectors of matrices with several other future luminaries of the domain, including Magnus Hestenes, J. Barkley Rosser, George Forsythe, Cornelius Lanczos, Gertrude Blanch, and William Karush. Magnus Hestenes's work on the conjugate gradient method was a direct outgrowth of this group's work together over the summer. High speed computers were not available yet, so numerical experiments to test theoretical results were performed by hand by Stein and other researchers. Stein in particular studied Rayleigh–Ritz methods of variational problems.

After earning his Ph.D. from the INA in January 1951, Stein was hired as a senior research engineer by aircraft manufacturer Convair in southern California. He primarily worked on missile simulations for the SM-65 Atlas, on which he worked with a UNIVAC 1103. Though the 1103 had been made for and used by the Armed Forces Security Agency under the name "Atlas 2", this was the first commercially sold 1103. Stein's work installing the UNIVAC 1103 with Minnesotan and University of Minnesota alumnus Erwin Tomash introduced him to the emerging computer-science scene in Minnesota in the 1950s.

Stein lost his job with Convair when his security clearance was revoked by the House Un-American Activities Committee on account of Stein's Jewish heritage. It was later re-instated, but Stein had already decided to move on.

== University of Minnesota ==
In 1955, Remington Rand, now the manufacturer of the UNIVAC computers after acquiring Engineering Research Associates, heard that the University of Minnesota was considering purchasing a machine from one of Rand's rivals: an IBM 650. Rand offered to simply give the university 400 free hours on a UNIVAC 1103 on the condition that they hire a dedicated faculty member to oversee its operations. Stein -- who had made frequent consulting trips to Engineering Research Associates's Minnesota headquarters -- was hired in the IT Mathematics department in the University of Minnesota to fulfill this condition, and he assumed stewardship of the UNIVAC. The UNIVAC 1103 was around 60 feet long, 30 feet wide, and weighed over 17 tons.

The UNIVAC was immediately useful to a number of research projects happening at the university, and demand for computing hours quickly outstripped supply. From 1955-1957, the single most frequent user of the machine was professor and chemist William Lipscomb, who would eventually be awarded the Nobel Prize in Chemistry. Other notable projects included work on statistical analysis and econometrics by Leonid Hurwicz, who would go on to win the Nobel Memorial Prize in Economic Sciences.

Stein taught the first University of Minnesota courses on high-speed computation and played a singular role in developing the university's path to computer science education. In 1958, Stein was made the head of the university's Numerical Analysis Center at the Institute of Technology (later the University Computer Center), for which the university purchased its own 1103 at a discounted price of $250,000. The center was also home to a REAC 100. Stein maintained a computer archives system for decades, over three significantly different generations of machine.

In 1967, Stein created - with William Munro, Neal Amundson, and Hans Weinberger - the university's graduate program in Computer and Information Sciences. Three years later, in 1970, Stein was a key player in the establishment of Computer Science as a full fledged academic department at the university. Stein resigned as head of the Computer Center and became the first head of this new Computer Science department. He stepped down the following year, and served as a professor in the department until his retirement in 1997.

Stein received a Guggenheim Fellowship in 1963-1964 for his work with Magnus Hestenes on the conjugate gradient method and for being the principal inventor of the Pope-Stein division algorithm and the Stein-Rose sorting algorithm. He served as a visiting professor of computer science at Weizmann Institute of Science in Rehovot, Israel from 1963 to 1964 and at Tel Aviv University and Hebrew University of Jerusalem from 1971 to 1972.

== Death ==
Stein died in 2015. His papers are held in the University of Minnesota Archives.

== Publications ==
In 1964, Stein wrote Computer Programming: A Mixed Language Approach with contributor William Munro for Academic Press. It was well reviewed in its time, and in 2017, more than five decades after its publication, it was still in print in its third edition. It was written with the intention to provide instruction in assembly language programming to both professional programmers and highly technical laypersons. Much of the book was originally designed around the CDC 1604 and the Fortran language.

== Bibliography ==
=== Books ===
- Stein, Marvin; Munro, William. Computer Programming: A Mixed Language Approach. (1964) Academic Press.
- Stein, Marvin; Munro, William. A Fortran introduction to programming and computers: including Fortran IV. (1966) Academic Press.

=== Papers ===
- Stein, Marvin (1952). "Gradient Methods in the Solution of Systems of Linear Equations" (PDF). Journal of Research of the National Bureau of Standards. 8 (6): 407–413. doi:10.6028/jres.048.052.
- Stein, M. L.; Rose, J.; Parker, D. B. (1959). "A compiler with an analog-oriented input language". Papers presented at the March 3-5, 1959, western joint computer conference on XX - IRE-AIEE-ACM '59 (Western). Association for Computing Machinery. pp. 92–102. doi:10.1145/1457838.1457855. S2CID 5628233.
- Stein, Marvin L.; Rose, Jack (1960). "Changing from Analog to Digital Programming by Digital Techniques". Journal of the ACM. 7 (1): 10–23. doi:10.1145/321008.321010. S2CID 17694132.
- Stein, Marvin L.; Pope, David A. (1960). "Multiple precision arithmetic". Communications of the ACM. 3 (12): 652–654. doi:10.1145/367487.367499. S2CID 392139.
- Stein, Marvin L. (1964). "Divide-and-correct methods for multiple precision division". Communications of the ACM. 7 (8): 472–474. doi:10.1145/355586.364796. S2CID 16077441.
- Stein, Marvin (1963). "Automatic Digital Programming of Analog Computers". IEEE Transactions on Computers. 12 (2): 100–111. Bibcode:1963ITECm..12..100S. doi:10.1109/PGEC.1963.263419. ISSN 0367-7508.
- Stein, M. L.; Mundstock, E. J. (1970). "Sorting Implicit Outputs in Digital Simulation". IEEE Transactions on Computers. 19 (9): 844–847. Bibcode:1970ITCmp.100..844S. doi:10.1109/T-C.1970.223052. S2CID 26156075.
- Stein, M. L.; Munro, W. D. (1971). "Scaling Machine Arithmetic". IEEE Transactions on Computers. 20 (6): 675–678. Bibcode:1971ITCmp.100..675S. doi:10.1109/T-C.1971.223324. S2CID 206618712.
- Stein, Marvin L. (1971). "On complement division". Communications of the ACM. 14 (4): 260–264. doi:10.1145/362575.362582. S2CID 10383466.
- Hestenes, M. R.; Stein, M. L. (1973). "The solution of linear equations by minimization". Journal of Optimization Theory and Applications. 11 (4): 335–359. doi:10.1007/BF00932485. S2CID 122370705.
