= Mary Massey =

American historian (1915–1974)

Mary Elizabeth Massey
- Born: 25 December 1915; Morrilton, Arkansas
- Died: 24 December 1974 (aged 58); Durham, North Carolina
- Education: Hendrix College (B.A., M.A.); University of North Carolina at Chapel Hill (Ph.D)
- Occupation: Historian

Mary Massey (25 December 1915 – 24 December 1974) was an American historian of the American Civil War.

== Life ==
Mary Elizabeth Massey was born in Morrilton, Arkansas, on 25 December 1915. She was awarded her B.A. degree from Hendrix College in 1937 and then her M.A. from the same institution three years later. She received her Ph.D. from the University of North Carolina at Chapel Hill in 1947. Massey taught high school in Arkansas in 1937–39 and then became head of the history department at Hendrix from 1940 to 1942. She became professor of history at Flora MacDonald College in Red Springs, North Carolina in 1942–44 and a teaching fellow at the University of North Carolina at Chapel Hill from 1944 to 1946. She was appointed as assistant professor at Winthrop College in Rock Hill, South Carolina, in 1947, promoted to associate professor three years later and then to full professor in 1954. Massey also acted as chair of the department in 1960–64. She died in Durham, North Carolina on 24 December 1974.

== Activities ==
Massey published Ersatz in the Confederacy in 1952 and contributed to Education in the South seven years later. She was on the advisory council of the National Civil War Centennial Committee and the South Carolina Civil War Centennial Committee from 1961 to 1965. Massey also served on the South Carolina Commission of Archives and History in 1962–63. She published Refugee Life in the Confederacy in 1964 and followed it with Bonnet Brigades: American Women and the Civil War two years later. From 1968 to 1971 she was on the South Carolina Tri-Centennial Commission and she was the president of the Southern Historical Association in 1971–72.
