= Order =

Order, ORDER or Orders most often refers to:

- A socio-political or established or existing order, e.g. World order, Ancien Regime, Pax Britannica
- Categorization, the process in which ideas and objects are recognized, differentiated, and understood
- Heterarchy, a system of organization wherein the elements have the potential to be ranked a number of different ways
- Hierarchy, an arrangement of items that are represented as being "above", "below", or "at the same level as" one another
- An action or inaction that must be obeyed, mandated by someone in authority

Order, ORDER or Orders may also refer to:

== People ==
- Orders (surname)

== Arts, entertainment, and media ==
- Order (film), a 2005 Russian film
- Order (album), 2009, by Maroon
- "Order", a 2016 song from Brand New Maid by Band-Maid
- Orders (1974 film), by Michel Brault
- "Orders" (Star Wars: The Clone Wars)

== Business ==
- Order (business), a buyer's intention to obtain goods and services from a seller
- Blanket order, a purchase order to allow multiple delivery dates over a period of time
- Money order or postal order, a financial instrument usually intended for sending money through the mail
- Purchase order, a document issued by a buyer to a seller, indicating types, quantities, and agreed prices
- Sales order, an order issued by a business or trader to a customer

== Exclusive organisations ==
- Order (distinction), a visible honour in society
  - Dynastic order of a presently or formerly sovereign royal house
  - National order of a sovereign state
  - Order of merit of a state or other entity
  - Order of precedence, a sequential hierarchy of the nominal importance of items
- Fraternal order
- Military order (religious society), established in the era of the Crusades
- Order of chivalry, established since the Middle Ages

== Legal and political terminology ==
- Court order, made by a judge, e.g., a restraining order
- Compulsory purchase order, allowing certain public bodies to acquire land or property without the consent of the owner
- Executive order (disambiguation)
- Law and order (politics), approach focusing on harsher enforcement and penalties as ways to reduce crime
- Public-order crime, type of crime that runs contrary to social order
  - Organized crime, groupings of highly centralized criminal enterprises
- Social order, set or system of linked social structures, institutions, relations, customs, values and practices
- Statutory instrument, type of delegated legislation
- Professional order, an organization which comprises all the members of the same profession

== Military ==
- Military order (disambiguation)
- Military order (instruction), binding instruction given by a senior rank to a junior rank in a military context
  - General order, a published directive from a commander
  - Standing order (disambiguation)
- An order of chivalry, if membership is conferred on military personnel as a result of valorous, exemplary or distinguished service
- Tactical formation, an arrangement or deployment of moving military forces

== Philosophy ==
- Great order of being, a mediaeval Christian conceptualisation of the physical world
- Order (logic), a property used to characterize logical systems
- Natural order (philosophy), the moral source from which natural law seeks to derive its authority

== Religion ==
- Orange Order, Protestant fraternal organization in Northern Ireland, includes the Canadian Orange Order, United States Orange Order]], African Orange Order and Scottish Orange Order
- Ecclesiastical decoration, order or a decoration conferred by a head of a church
- Holy orders, the rite or sacrament in which clergy are ordained
- Monastic order, a religious way of life in which one renounces worldly pursuits to devote oneself fully to spiritual work
- Order of Mass, an outline of a Mass celebration
- Religious order, a community or organization set apart from the general society for devotion to a religious practice
  - Religious order (Catholic), a religious order in the context of the Roman Catholic Church
    - Canon regular, or canonical order, a class of religious orders for priests in the Catholic Church

== Science and technology ==
=== Biology and healthcare ===
- Order (taxonomy), a taxonomic classification of organisms by rank
  - Order, in phytosociology, an ecological grouping of plants, between alliance and class
  - Ordo naturalis (natural order), an outdated rank in biology, equivalent to the modern rank of family
- Order, in medicine, refers to a formal request made by authorized health practitioners to carry out a specific clinical action concerning diagnosis or treatment

=== Computing ===
- Order of computation, the computational complexity in the analysis of algorithms
  - Big O notation, notation describing limiting behavior
- Z-order, which graphics cover up others on computer screens

=== Mathematics ===
- Order (journal), an academic journal on order theory
- Order, an arrangement of items in sequence
- Order, the result of enumeration of a set of items
- Order, a mathematical structure modeling sequenced items, dealt with in order theory
- Order of hierarchical complexity, quantified by the model of hierarchical complexity, the ordinal complexity of tasks that are addressed
- Ordered set, an ordered structure, in mathematics
- Order (ring theory), concept in algebraic number theory
- Ordinate in mathematics, the y element of an ordered pair (x, y)
- Partially ordered set
  - Complete partial order
- Permutation, the act of arranging all the members of a set into some sequence or order
- Ranking
- Stochastic ordering of random variables or probability distributions

=== Physics ===
- Implicate and explicate order, ontological concepts for quantum theory
- Order and disorder (physics), measured by an order parameter or more generally by entropy
- Order, optics, the category number of lighthouse Fresnel lenses, defining size and focal length
- Topological order in quantum mechanics, an organized quantum state

=== Signal processing ===
- First-order hold, a mathematical model of the practical reconstruction of sampled signals
- Polynomial order, of a filter transfer function

=== Other uses in science and technology ===
- ORDER (spacecraft), a space debris removal transport satellite
- Order (mouldings), each of a series of recessed arches and supports around a doorway or similar feature
- Classical order, architectonic orders in architecture
- Collation, the ordering of information
  - Alphabetical order, the ordering of letters
- Order of reaction, a concept of chemical kinetics
- Spontaneous order, the natural emergence of structure in systems
- Stream order, used to define river networks based on a hierarchy of tributaries

== See also ==
- Chaos (disambiguation)
- Classification
- Coordination (disambiguation)
- Disorder (disambiguation)
- Ordinal (disambiguation)
- Organization (disambiguation)
- Structure (disambiguation)
