= Structure (disambiguation) =

Topics referred to by the same term

The structure of a thing is how the parts of it relate to each other, how it is "assembled".

Structure may also refer to:

== Architecture ==
- Architectural structure, a man-made structure used or intended for supporting or sheltering any use or continuous occupancy
  - Building
  - Nonbuilding structure
  - Building (disambiguation)

== Engineering ==
- Structural engineering
- Structural analysis, the study of the strength and properties of structures

== Biology ==
- Canopy (biology) structure, organization or three-dimensional geometry of a plant canopy
- Community (ecology) structure, ecological organization of a biological community
- Structure (journal), a scientific journal describing protein structures
- Structure, a journal on form and function in modern biology
- STRUCTURE, a population clustering method and software package

== Chemistry ==
- Chemical structure, the spatial arrangement of atoms and bonds in a molecule
  - Protein structure
- The spatial arrangement of ions, atoms, or molecules in condensed matter
  - Crystal structure
  - Structure of liquids and glasses

== Mathematics ==
- Mathematical structure on a set, additional mathematical objects that in some manner attach to the set, making it easier to visualize or work with, or endowing the collection with meaning or significance
- Algebraic structure, the systems that are studied in universal algebra
- Structure (mathematical logic), the mathematical structures studied in model theory
- Structure constants, defining a Lie algebra or an algebra over a field
- Structuralism (philosophy of mathematics), a theory in the philosophy of mathematics that holds that mathematical theories describe structures of mathematical objects

== Social sciences and linguistics ==
- Structuralism, the theory that elements of human culture must be understood in terms of their relationship to a larger, overarching system or structure
- Structural linguistics, an approach to linguistics originating from the work of Ferdinand de Saussure, a part of the overall approach of structuralism
- Deep structure and surface structure, concepts in linguistics, specifically the study of syntax in the Chomskyan tradition
- Social structure, a pattern of social arrangements in society
- Structural functionalism, a theory of society as a system whose parts work together to promote solidarity and stability
- Functional structuralism, a theory of society that deduces structure from function
- Structural anthropology, a theory of social structure in primitive societies, strongly associated with the work of Claude Lévi Strauss
- Biogenetic structuralism, a theory of anthropology grounded in neuroscience
- Structuration theory, a theory of social systems based in the analysis of both structure and agents
- Structure and agency, two confronted theories about human behaviour
- Base and superstructure, two parts of a Marxist analysis of society
- Structural Marxism, an approach to Marxism based on structuralism, associated with Louis Althusser
- Structuralism (architecture), a structuralist critique of architecture
- Structuralist film theory, a branch of film theory rooted in structuralism
- Post-structuralism, the theory that structuralism evolved into

== Literature ==
- Dramatic structure, the way dramatic works, such as plays or films, are organized
- Narrative structure, the order and manner in which a narrative is presented to a reader, listener, or viewer

== Finance ==
- Financial structure, the area of finance dealing with monetary decisions that business enterprises make and the tools and analysis used to make these decisions
  - Capital structure, the way a corporation finances its assets through a combination of equity, debt, or hybrid securities
  - Structured finance, a sector of finance created to help provide increased liquidity or funding sources to markets

== Music ==
- Musical structure (disambiguation)
- Structure (Terri Lyne Carrington, Jimmy Haslip, Greg Osby, and Adam Rogers album), 2004
- Structure (Water from Your Eyes album), 2021
- Structures (John Abercrombie album), 2006
- Structures (Boulez), composition
- Structures (John Digweed album), 2010
- Structures (band), a Canadian metalcore band

== Other uses ==
- Structural art, examples of structural engineering that attain excellence in the three areas of efficiency, economy, and elegance
- Large-scale structure of the cosmos
- Structural geology, the three dimensional distribution of rock bodies and their planar or folded surfaces, and their internal fabrics
- Data structure, a way of storing data in a computer so that it can be used efficiently
- The Structure of Scientific Revolutions, a 1962 book by Thomas Kuhn on the history of science
- Structure, the former name for the Express Men clothing brand
- New Structure, a political party in Greece

== See also ==
- Struct
- Order (disambiguation)
