= Build =

Build may refer to:

- Build (game engine), a 1995 first-person shooter engine
- "Build" (song), a 1987 song by The Housemartins
- Microsoft Build, a developer conference
- Software build, a compiled version of software, or the process of producing it
- Better Utilizing Investments to Leverage Development (BUILD), a United States federal government program
- Grok Build, an AI coding agent developed by SpaceXAI

== See also ==
- Built (disambiguation)
- Building (disambiguation)
- Bild, German newspaper
- Engineering
- Construction
- Human height
- Human body
