= Order of Orange =

Order of Orange or Orange Order or variant may refer to:

- Orange Order of Northern Ireland
  - Orange Order in Canada
- Independent Orange Order of Belfast
- Order of the House of Orange of the Netherlands, dynastic knighthood order
- Order of Orange-Nassau of the Netherlands, chivalric order
- Flag of the Orange Order

== See also ==
- Orange (disambiguation)
- Order (disambiguation)
- Orange Free State Command, South Africa army force division
