= Military order =

Military order may refer to:

== Orders ==
- Military order (religious society), confraternity of knights originally established as religious societies during the medieval Crusades for protection of Christianity and the Catholic Church

== Military organisation and terms ==
- Military order (instruction), including an individual command by an armed forces officer to a person under his command
  - General order, a published directive originated by a commander of a military organization
  - Operations order, an executable plan that directs a unit on how to conduct a military operation
  - Close order drill, a form of military parade for ceremonial purposes
- Martial law, order and security maintained by the military when government or civilian authorities fail to function effectively
- Military justice or military law, a body of laws and procedures governing members of the armed forces

== See also ==
- Order (honour), a designation of merit awarded by a government, dynastic house, sovereign or organization to an individual
- Shortlex order, a method for ordering sequences in mathematics and formal language theory.
