= United States Army enlisted rank insignia 1902–1920 =

The era from 1902 to 1920 was the most complex era for enlisted rank insignia in the United States Army. During that time the army was organized with each branch (cavalry, infantry, artillery, etc.) having its own rank structure. This led to a large number of insignia designs being used.

On July 17, 1902, the army issued General Order 81 prescribing new uniforms. Enlisted chevrons were made smaller and changed to point up. The smaller chevrons were due to the wearing of shirts as outerwear in the warm climates that the army was operating in at the time. The army had allowed chevrons on shirts in July 1898. The large coat chevrons in use at the time did not fit on shirt sleeves so soldiers began to fashion smaller versions of their chevrons. The army gave preliminary approval of smaller chevrons in 1900. The new regulations made the smaller chevrons the standard for all uniforms.

The insignia was to be in the colors of each branch, light blue for infantry, yellow for cavalry, red for artillery, buff for the Quartermaster's Department that included the detachment at West Point, grey for the Subsistence Department, maroon piped with white for the Medical Department, red piped with white for the Corps of Engineers, black piped with red for the Ordnance Department and orange piped with white for the Signal Corps. They would be worn on a background matching the coat. This meant that each design was placed on backgrounds of blue, white, khaki and olive drab. There was also a rust colored fatigue uniform worn by men of the artillery at emplacements. Regulations call for "usual chevrons", which would have meant red on a rust background. It seems in practice the chevrons were brown or tan.

== US Army Sergeants' Chevrons 1902 ==
| | Quartermaster's Department USMA Detachment | Subsistence Department' (Post Commissary Sergeant) | Medical Department (Acting Hospital Steward) | Corps of Engineers | Ordnance Department | Signal Corps | Cavalry | Corps of Artillery | Infantry |
|---|---|---|---|---|---|---|---|---|---|
| Dress Blue | | | | | | | | | |
| White | | | | | | | | | |
| Khaki | | | | | | | | | |
| Olive Drab | | | | | | | | | |
| Fatigue | | | | | | | | | |

== US Army Olive Drab Chevrons 1902 ==
| | Regimental Sergeant Major | Sergeant Major Senior Grade | Ordnance Sergeant | Post-Commissary Sergeant | Post Quartermaster Sergeant | Electrician Sergeant | Hospital Steward | Sergeant First Class | Regimental Quartermaster Sergeant | Regimental Commissary Sergeant | Chief Musician | Squadron Sergeant Major | Battalion Sergeant Major | Sergeant Major Junior Grade | Color Sergeant | Chief Trumpeter | Principal Musician | Battalion Quartermaster Sergeant | First Sergeant | Drum Major | Sergeant | Company/Battery/Troop Quartermaster Sergeant | Stable Sergeant | Acting Hospital Steward | Corporal | Cook | Ferrier and Blacksmith | Saddler | Wagoner | Trumpeter | Mechanic | Musician | Artificer | Lance Acting Hospital Steward | Private Serving as Lance Corporal | Private First Class | Private Second Class | Private of the Hospital Corps | Private |
|---|---|---|---|---|---|---|---|---|---|---|---|---|---|---|---|---|---|---|---|---|---|---|---|---|---|---|---|---|---|---|---|---|---|---|---|---|---|---|---|
| Quartermaster's Department | | | | | | | | | | | | | | | | | | | | | | | | | | | | | | | | | | | | | | | |
| Subsistence Department | | | | | | | | | | | | | | | | | | | | | | | | | | | | | | | | | | | | | | | |
| Medical Department | | | | | | | | | | | | | | | | | | | | | | | | | | | | | | | | | | | | | | | |
| Corps of Engineers | | | | | | | | | | | | | | | | | | | | | | | | | | | | | | | | No Insignia | | | | | | | No Insignia |
| Ordnance Department | | | | | | | | | | | | | | | | | | | | | | | | | | | | | | | | | | | | | No Insignia | | |
| Signal Corps | | | | | | | | | | | | | | | | | | | | | | | | | | | | | | | | | | | | | | | |
| Cavalry | | | | | | | | | | | | | | | | | | | | | | | | | | | | | No Insignia | No Insignia | | | | | | | | | No Insignia |
| Artillery Corps | | | | | | | | | | | | | | | | | | | | | | | | | | | | | | | | No Insignia | | | | | | | No Insignia |
| Infantry | | | | | | | | | | | | | | | | | | | | | | | | | | | | | | | | No Insignia | | | | | | | No Insignia |
| Military Academy Detachment | | | | | | | | | | | | | | | | | | | | | | | | | | | | | | | | No Insignia | | | | | | | No Insignia |

On March 2, 1903, the rank structure of the medical department was changed to Sergeant First Class (replacing Hospital Steward), Sergeant (replacing Acting Hospital Steward), Corporal, Lance Corporal (replacing Lance Acting Hospital Steward), Private First Class and Private. Insignia was prescribed on April 28, 1903.

| | | | | | No Insignia |
| Sergeant First Class | Sergeant | Corporal | Lance Corporal | Private First Class | Private |

On October 1, 1903, the color for infantry was changed from light blue to white.

== US Army Olive Drab Chevrons 1903 ==
| | Regimental Sergeant Major | Sergeant Major Senior Grade | Ordnance Sergeant | Post-Commissary Sergeant | Post Quartermaster Sergeant | Master Electrician | Electrician Sergeant | Sergeant First Class | Regimental Quartermaster Sergeant | Regimental Commissary Sergeant | Chief Musician | Squadron Sergeant Major | Battalion Sergeant Major | Sergeant Major Junior Grade | Color Sergeant | Chief Trumpeter | Principal Musician | Battalion Quartermaster Sergeant | First Sergeant | Drum Major | Sergeant | Company/Battery/Troop Quartermaster | Stable Sergeant | Corporal | Cook | Ferrier and Blacksmith | Saddler | Wagoner | Trumpeter | Mechanic | Musician | Artificer | Private Serving as Lance Corporal | Private First Class | Private Second Class | Private |
|---|---|---|---|---|---|---|---|---|---|---|---|---|---|---|---|---|---|---|---|---|---|---|---|---|---|---|---|---|---|---|---|---|---|---|---|---|
| Quartermaster's Department | | | | | | | | | | | | | | | | | | | | | | | | | | | | | | | | | | | | |
| Subsistence Department | | | | | | | | | | | | | | | | | | | | | | | | | | | | | | | | | | | | |
| Medical Department | | | | | | | | | | | | | | | | | | | | | | | | | | | | | | | | | | | | No Insignia |
| Corps of Engineers | | | | | | | | | | | | | | | | | | | | | | | | | | | | | | | No Insignia | | | | | No Insignia |
| Ordnance Department | | | | | | | | | | | | | | | | | | | | | | | | | | | | | | | | | | | No Insignia | No Insignia |
| Signal Corps | | | | | | | | | | | | | | | | | | | | | | | | | | | | | | | | | | | | |
| Cavalry | | | | | | | | | | | | | | | | | | | | | | | | | | | | No Insignia | No Insignia | | | | | | | No Insignia |
| Artillery Corps | | | | | | | | | | | | | | | | | | | | | | | | | | | | | | | No Insignia | | | | | No Insignia |
| Infantry | | | | | | | | | | | | | | | | | | | | | | | | | | | | | | | No Insignia | | | | | No Insignia |
| Military Academy Detachment | | | | | | | | | | | | | | | | | | | | | | | | | | | | | | | No Insignia | | | | | No Insignia |

A rank of Master Signal Electrician was added to the Signal Corps on April 28, 1904. Also on that date a Band Sergeant and Assistant Leader was added to the West Point Band. He probably wore the three chevrons of a sergeant.

New uniform regulations were issued on December 31, 1904 that not only prescribed insignia for Master Signal Electricians but changed the color of all insignia not worn on the dress blue coat. Supplying so many versions of insignia had proved to be difficult and costly. The regulation changed the insignia for the white, khaki and olive drab coats from branch colors to olive drab shirting flannel.

== US Army Olive Drab Chevrons 1904–1906 ==
| | Regimental Sergeant Major | Sergeant Major Senior Grade | Ordnance Sergeant | Post-Commissary Sergeant | Post Quartermaster Sergeant | Master Electrician | Electrician Sergeant | Sergeant First Class | Master Signal Electrician | Regimental Quartermaster Sergeant | Regimental Commissary Sergeant | Band Sergeant and Assistant Leader | Chief Musician | Squadron Sergeant Major | Battalion Sergeant Major | Sergeant Major Junior Grade | Color Sergeant | Chief Trumpeter | Principal Musician | Battalion Quartermaster Sergeant | First Sergeant | Drum Major | Sergeant | Company/Battery/Troop Quartermaster | Stable Sergeant | Corporal | Cook | Ferrier and Blacksmith | Saddler | Wagoner | Trumpeter | Mechanic | Musician | Artificer | Private Serving as Lance Corporal | Private First Class | Private Second Class | Private |
|---|---|---|---|---|---|---|---|---|---|---|---|---|---|---|---|---|---|---|---|---|---|---|---|---|---|---|---|---|---|---|---|---|---|---|---|---|---|---|
| Quartermaster's Department | | | | | | | | | | | | | | | | | | | | | | | | | | | | | | | | | | | | | | |
| Subsistence Department | | | | | | | | | | | | | | | | | | | | | | | | | | | | | | | | | | | | | | |
| Medical Department | | | | | | | | | | | | | | | | | | | | | | | | | | | | | | | | | | | | | | No Insignia |
| Corps of Engineers | | | | | | | | | | | | | | | | | | | | | | | | | | | | | | | | | No Insignia | | | | | No Insignia |
| Ordnance Department | | | | | | | | | | | | | | | | | | | | | | | | | | | | | | | | | | | | | No Insignia | No Insignia |
| Signal Corps | | | | | | | | | | | | | | | | | | | | | | | | | | | | | | | | | | | | | | |
| Cavalry | | | | | | | | | | | | | | | | | | | | | | | | | | | | | | No Insignia | No Insignia | | | | | | | No Insignia |
| Artillery Corps | | | | | | | | | | | | | | | | | | | | | | | | | | | | | | | | | No Insignia | | | | | No Insignia |
| Infantry | | | | | | | | | | | | | | | | | | | | | | | | | | | | | | | | | No Insignia | | | | | No Insignia |
| Military Academy Detachment | | | | | | | | | | | | | | | | | | | | | | | | | | | | | | | | | No Insignia | | | | | No Insignia |

On January 25, 1907, The Corps of Artillery was split into Field Artillery regiments and a Coast Artillery Corps. The regimental structure for the field artillery added the ranks of Regimental Sergeant Major, Regimental Quartermaster Sergeant, Regimental Commissary Sergeant, Battalion Quartermaster Sergeant and Chief Mechanic. In the Coast Artillery Corps the ranks of Master Gunner and Engineer were added and electrician sergeants were split into two classes. Artificers were removed from both organizations.

Insignia was prescribed on August 14, 1907. Engineers wore a governor in a ring and Master Gunners a shell in a wreath. Master electricians now wore lightning in a wreath, Electrician Sergeants First Class three chevrons, one arc and lightning and Electrician Sergeants Second Class three chevrons and lightning.

| Master Gunner | Engineer | Master Electrician | Electrician Sergeant First Class | Electrician Sergeant Second Class |

== US Army Olive Drab Chevrons 1907 ==
| | Regimental Sergeant Major | Sergeant Major Senior Grade | Master Electrician | Master Signal Electrician | Engineer | Electrician Sergeant First Class | Ordnance Sergeant | Post-Commissary Sergeant | Post Quartermaster Sergeant | Sergeant First Class | Electrician Sergeant Second Class | Master Gunner | Regimental Quartermaster Sergeant | Regimental Commissary Sergeant | ! class="nowrap ts-vertical-header " style="" | Band Sergeant and Assistant Leader | Chief Musician | Squadron Sergeant Major | Battalion Sergeant Major | Sergeant Major Junior Grade | Color Sergeant | Chief Trumpeter | Principal Musician | Battalion Quartermaster Sergeant | First Sergeant | Drum Major | Sergeant | Company /Batter/Troop Quartermaster Sergeant | Stable Sergeant | Corporal | Fireman | Cook | Ferrier and Blacksmith | Saddler | Wagoner | Trumpeter | Chief Mechanic | Mechanic | Musician | Artificer | Private Serving As Lance Corporal | Private First Class | Private Second Class | Private |
|---|---|---|---|---|---|---|---|---|---|---|---|---|---|---|---|---|---|---|---|---|---|---|---|---|---|---|---|---|---|---|---|---|---|---|---|---|---|---|---|---|---|---|---|
| Quartermaster's Department | | | | | | | | | | | | | | | | | | | | | | | | | | | | | | | | | | | | | | | | | | | |
| Subsistence Department | | | | | | | | | | | | | | | | | | | | | | | | | | | | | | | | | | | | | | | | | | | |
| Medical Department | | | | | | | | | | | | | | | | | | | | | | | | | | | | | | | | | | | | | | | | | | | No Insignia |
| Corps of Engineers | | | | | | | | | | | | | | | | | | | | | | | | | | | | | | | | | | | | | | No Insignia | | | | No Insignia | No Insignia |
| Ordnance Department | | | | | | | | | | | | | | | | | | | | | | | | | | | | | | | | | | | | | | | | | | No Insignia | |
| Signal Corps | | | | | | | | | | | | | | | | | | | | | | | | | | | | | | | | | | | | | | | | | | | |
| Cavalry | | | | | | | | | | | | | | | | | | | | | | | | | | | | | | | | | | No Insignia | No Insignia | | | | | | | | No Insignia |
| Field Artillery | | | | | | | | | | | | | | | | | | | | | | | | | | | | | | | | | | | | | | No Insignia | | | | | No Insignia |
| Coast Artillery Corps | | | | | | | | | | | | | | | | | | | | | | | | | | | | | | | | | | | | | | No Insignia | | | | | No Insignia |
| Infantry | | | | | | | | | | | | | | | | | | | | | | | | | | | | | | | | | | | | | | No Insignia | | | | | No Insignia |
| Military Academy | | | | | | | | | | | | | | | | | | | | | | | | | | | | | | | | | | No Insignia | No Insignia | | | No Insignia | | | | | No Insignia |

Insignia for the coast artillery was changed again on January 18, 1908. Master Gunners now wore a shell in a wreath under a star, Engineers wore the same with a governor instead of a shell and Master Electricians wore the same with lightning. Electrician Sergeants wore three chevrons over a wreath with lightning with first class being denoted by a bar. Firemen now wore one chevron and one arc with a governor.

The background of all private first class style insignia was made round instead of rectangular to save cloth.

| Master Gunner | Engineer | Master Electrician | Electrician Sergeant First Class | Electrician Sergeant Second Class | Fireman |

== US Army Olive Drab Chevrons 1908 ==
| | Regimental Sergeant Major | Sergeant Major Senior Grade | Master Electrician | Master Signal Electrician | Engineer | Electrician Sergeant First Class | Ordnance Sergeant | Post-Commissary Sergeant | Post Quartermaster Sergeant | Sergeant First Class | Electrician Sergeant Second Class | Master Gunner | Regimental Quartermaster Sergeant | Regimental Commissary Sergeant | ! class="nowrap ts-vertical-header " style="" | Band Sergeant and Assistant Leader | Chief Musician | Squadron Sergeant Major | Battalion Sergeant Major | Sergeant Major Junior Grade | Color Sergeant | Chief Trumpeter | Principal Musician | Battalion Quartermaster Sergeant | First Sergeant | Drum Major | Sergeant | Company /Batter/Troop Quartermaster Sergeant | Stable Sergeant | Corporal | Fireman | Cook | Ferrier and Blacksmith | Saddler | Wagoner | Trumpeter | Chief Mechanic | Mechanic | Musician | Artificer | Private Serving As Lance Corporal | Private First Class | Private Second Class | Privates |
|---|---|---|---|---|---|---|---|---|---|---|---|---|---|---|---|---|---|---|---|---|---|---|---|---|---|---|---|---|---|---|---|---|---|---|---|---|---|---|---|---|---|---|---|
| Quartermaster's Department | | | | | | | | | | | | | | | | | | | | | | | | | | | | | | | | | | | | | | | | | | | |
| Subsistence Department | | | | | | | | | | | | | | | | | | | | | | | | | | | | | | | | | | | | | | | | | | | |
| Medical Department | | | | | | | | | | | | | | | | | | | | | | | | | | | | | | | | | | | | | | | | | | | No Insignia |
| Corps of Engineers | | | | | | | | | | | | | | | | | | | | | | | | | | | | | | | | | | | | | | No Insignia | | | | No Insignia | No Insignia |
| Ordnance Department | | | | | | | | | | | | | | | | | | | | | | | | | | | | | | | | | | | | | | | | | | No Insignia | |
| Signal Corps | | | | | | | | | | | | | | | | | | | | | | | | | | | | | | | | | | | | | | | | | | | |
| Cavalry | | | | | | | | | | | | | | | | | | | | | | | | | | | | | | | | | | No Insignia | No Insignia | | | | | | | | No Insignia |
| Field Artillery | | | | | | | | | | | | | | | | | | | | | | | | | | | | | | | | | | | | | | No Insignia | | | | | No Insignia |
| Coast Artillery Corps | | | | | | | | | | | | | | | | | | | | | | | | | | | | | | | | | | | | | | No Insignia | | | | | No Insignia |
| Infantry | | | | | | | | | | | | | | | | | | | | | | | | | | | | | | | | | | | | | | No Insignia | | | | | No Insignia |
| Military Academy | | | | | | | | | | | | | | | | | | | | | | | | | | | | | | | | | | No Insignia | No Insignia | | | No Insignia | | | | | No Insignia |

In January 1909 the Band Sergeant and Assistant Leader of the West Point Band and the Sergeant In charge of the West Point field musicians were given distinctive insignia.

On January 22, 1909, Master Signal Electricians were given insignia different from other Master Electricians.

On March 3, 1909, enlisted detachments were added to the army's various service schools.

On June 12, 1909, the rust fatigue uniform was replaced with a uniform made of blue denim.

Insignia for the new uniform was prescribed on November 4, 1909. They were to be of "red washable material placed on a background of blue denim cloth". It seems that in practice the army never found a red washable material that was color fast. Instead the chevrons were just outlines of red stitching.

| Band Sergeant and Assistant Leader | Sergeant of Field Music | Master Signal Electrician |

== US Army Olive Drab Chevrons 1909 ==
| | Regimental Sergeant Major | Sergeant Major Senior Grade | Master Electrician | Master Signal Electrician | Engineer | Electrician Sergeant First Class | Ordnance Sergeant | Post-Commissary Sergeant | Post Quartermaster Sergeant | Sergeant First Class | Electrician Sergeant Second Class | Master Gunner | Regimental Quartermaster Sergeant | Regimental Commissary Sergeant | Chief Musician | Squadron Sergeant Major | Battalion Sergeant Major | Sergeant Major Junior Grade | Color Sergeant | Chief Trumpeter | Principal Musician | Battalion Quartermaster Sergeant | First Sergeant | Drum Major | Band Sergeant and Assistant Leader | Sergeant of Field Music | Sergeant | Company /Battery/Troop Quartermaster Sergeant | Stable Sergeant | Corporal | Fireman | Cook | Acting Cook Hospital Corps | Farrier | Horseshoer | Saddler | Wagoner | Trumpeter | Chief Mechanic | Mechanic | Musician | Artificer | Private Serving as Lance Corporal | Private First Class | Private Second Class | Private |
|---|---|---|---|---|---|---|---|---|---|---|---|---|---|---|---|---|---|---|---|---|---|---|---|---|---|---|---|---|---|---|---|---|---|---|---|---|---|---|---|---|---|---|---|---|---|---|
| Quartermaster's Department | | | | | | | | | | | | | | | | | | | | | | | | | | | | | | | | | | | | | | | | | | | | | | |
| Subsistence Department | | | | | | | | | | | | | | | | | | | | | | | | | | | | | | | | | | | | | | | | | | | | | | |
| Medical Department | | | | | | | | | | | | | | | | | | | | | | | | | | | | | | | | | | | | | | | | | | | | | | No Insignia |
| Corps of Engineers | | | | | | | | | | | | | | | | | | | | | | | | | | | | | | | | | | | | | | | | | No Insignia | | | | No Insignia | No Insignia |
| Ordnance Department | | | | | | | | | | | | | | | | | | | | | | | | | | | | | | | | | | | | | | | | | | | | | No Insignia | |
| Signal Corps | | | | | | | | | | | | | | | | | | | | | | | | | | | | | | | | | | | | | | | | | | | | | | |
| Cavalry | | | | | | | | | | | | | | | | | | | | | | | | | | | | | | | | | | | | | No Insignia | No Insignia | | | | | | | | No Insignia |
| Field Artillery | | | | | | | | | | | | | | | | | | | | | | | | | | | | | | | | | | | | | | | | | No Insignia | | | | | No Insignia |
| Coast Artillery Corps | | | | | | | | | | | | | | | | | | | | | | | | | | | | | | | | | | | | | | | | | No Insignia | | | | | No Insignia |
| Infantry | | | | | | | | | | | | | | | | | | | | | | | | | | | | | | | | | | | | | | | | | No Insignia | | | | | No Insignia |
| Military Academy | | | | | | | | | | | | | | | | | | | | | | | | | | | | | | | | | | | | | | | | | | | | | | No Insignia |
| Service School Detachments | | | | | | | | | | | | | | | | | | | | | | | | | | | | | | | | | | | | | | | | | | | | | | No Insignia |

On March 10, 1910, enlisted detachments at service schools were ordered to wear green dress chevrons and the detachment at West Point was ordered to wear green piped with white.

On March 23, 1910, the title of Farrier and Blacksmith was shortened to just Farrier and a rank of Horseshoer was added. Insignia was prescribed on June 13, 1910. Horseshoers would continue the horseshoe of Farriers and Blacksmiths, Farriers would now wear a horse head and insignia for Wagoners was now a wagon wheel.

| Horseshoer (Cavalry) | Horseshoer (Field Artillery) | Farrier (Cavalry) | Wagoner (Cavalry) |

== US Army Olive Drab Chevrons 1910 ==
| | Regimental Sergeant Major | Sergeant Major Senior Grade | Master Electrician | Master Signal Electrician | Engineer | Electrician Sergeant First Class | Ordnance Sergeant | Post-Commissary Sergeant | Post Quartermaster Sergeant | Sergeant First Class | Electrician Sergeant Second Class | Master Gunner | Regimental Quartermaster Sergeant | Regimental Commissary Sergeant | Chief Musician | Squadron Sergeant Major | Battalion Sergeant Major | Sergeant Major Junior Grade | Color Sergeant | Chief Trumpeter | Principal Musician | Battalion Quartermaster Sergeant | First Sergeant | Drum Major | Band Sergeant and Assistant Leader | Sergeant of Field Music | Sergeant | Company /Battery/Troop Quartermaster Sergeant | Stable Sergeant | Corporal | Fireman | Cook | Acting Cook Hospital Corps | Farrier | Horseshoer | Saddler | Wagoner | Trumpeter | Chief Mechanic | Mechanic | Musician | Artificer | Private Serving as Lance Corporal | Private First Class | Private Second Class | Private |
|---|---|---|---|---|---|---|---|---|---|---|---|---|---|---|---|---|---|---|---|---|---|---|---|---|---|---|---|---|---|---|---|---|---|---|---|---|---|---|---|---|---|---|---|---|---|---|
| Quartermaster's Department | | | | | | | | | | | | | | | | | | | | | | | | | | | | | | | | | | | | | | | | | | | | | | |
| Subsistence Department | | | | | | | | | | | | | | | | | | | | | | | | | | | | | | | | | | | | | | | | | | | | | | |
| Medical Department | | | | | | | | | | | | | | | | | | | | | | | | | | | | | | | | | | | | | | | | | | | | | | No Insignia |
| Corps of Engineers | | | | | | | | | | | | | | | | | | | | | | | | | | | | | | | | | | | | | | | | | No Insignia | | | | No Insignia | No Insignia |
| Ordnance Department | | | | | | | | | | | | | | | | | | | | | | | | | | | | | | | | | | | | | | | | | | | | | No Insignia | |
| Signal Corps | | | | | | | | | | | | | | | | | | | | | | | | | | | | | | | | | | | | | | | | | | | | | | |
| Cavalry | | | | | | | | | | | | | | | | | | | | | | | | | | | | | | | | | | | | | | No Insignia | | | | | | | | No Insignia |
| Field Artillery | | | | | | | | | | | | | | | | | | | | | | | | | | | | | | | | | | | | | | | | | No Insignia | | | | | No Insignia |
| Coast Artillery Corps | | | | | | | | | | | | | | | | | | | | | | | | | | | | | | | | | | | | | | | | | No Insignia | | | | | No Insignia |
| Infantry | | | | | | | | | | | | | | | | | | | | | | | | | | | | | | | | | | | | | | | | | No Insignia | | | | | No Insignia |
| Military Academy | | | | | | | | | | | | | | | | | | | | | | | | | | | | | | | | | | | | | | | | | No Insignia | | | | | No Insignia |
| Service School Detachments | | | | | | | | | | | | | | | | | | | | | | | | | | | | | | | | | | | | | | | | | | | | | | No Insignia |

New uniform regulations, issued on December 29, 1911, eliminated the khaki uniform and therefore the need for chevrons with a khaki background. Privates of the Signal Corps no longer wore insignia.

== US Army Olive Drab Chevrons 1911 ==
| | Regimental Sergeant Major | Sergeant Major Senior Grade | Master Electrician | Master Signal Electrician | Engineer | Electrician Sergeant First Class | Ordnance Sergeant | Post-Commissary Sergeant | Post Quartermaster Sergeant | Sergeant First Class | Electrician Sergeant Second Class | Master Gunner | Regimental Quartermaster Sergeant | Regimental Commissary Sergeant | Chief Musician | Squadron Sergeant Major | Battalion Sergeant Major | Sergeant Majors Junior Grade | Color Sergeant | Chief Trumpeter | Principal Musician | Battalion Quartermaster Sergeant | First Sergeant | Drum Major | ! class="nowrap ts-vertical-header " style="" | Band Sergeant and Assistant Leader | Sergeant of Field Music | Sergeant | Company/ Battery/ Troop Quartermaster Sergeant | Stable Sergeant | Corporal | Fireman | Cook | Acting Cook | Farrier | Horseshoer | Saddlers | Wagoner | Trumpeter | Chief Mechanic | Mechanic | Musician | Artificer | Private Serving as Lance Corporal | Private First Class | Private Second Class | Private |
|---|---|---|---|---|---|---|---|---|---|---|---|---|---|---|---|---|---|---|---|---|---|---|---|---|---|---|---|---|---|---|---|---|---|---|---|---|---|---|---|---|---|---|---|---|---|---|
| Quartermaster's Department | | | | | | | | | | | | | | | | | | | | | | | | | | | | | | | | | | | | | | | | | | | | | | |
| Subsistence Department | | | | | | | | | | | | | | | | | | | | | | | | | | | | | | | | | | | | | | | | | | | | | | |
| Medical Department | | | | | | | | | | | | | | | | | | | | | | | | | | | | | | | | | | | | | | | | | | | | | | No Insignia |
| Corps of Engineers | | | | | | | | | | | | | | | | | | | | | | | | | | | | | | | | | | | | | | | | | No Insignia | | | | No Insignia | No Insignia |
| Ordnance Department | | | | | | | | | | | | | | | | | | | | | | | | | | | | | | | | | | | | | | | | | | | | | No Insignia | |
| Signal Corps | | | | | | | | | | | | | | | | | | | | | | | | | | | | | | | | | | | | | | | | | | | | | | No Insignia |
| Cavalry | | | | | | | | | | | | | | | | | | | | | | | | | | | | | | | | | | | | | | No Insignia | | | | | | | | No Insignia |
| Field Artillery | | | | | | | | | | | | | | | | | | | | | | | | | | | | | | | | | | | | | | | | | No Insignia | | | | | No Insignia |
| Coast Artillery Corps | | | | | | | | | | | | | | | | | | | | | | | | | | | | | | | | | | | | | | | | | No Insignia | | | | | No Insignia |
| Infantry | | | | | | | | | | | | | | | | | | | | | | | | | | | | | | | | | | | | | | | | | No Insignia | | | | | No Insignia |
| Military Academy | | | | | | | | | | | | | | | | | | | | | | | | | | | | | | | | | | | | | | | | | No Insignia | | | | | No Insignia |
| Service School Detachments | | | | | | | | | | | | | | | | | | | | | | | | | | | | | | | | | | | | | | | | | No Insignia | | | | | No Insignia |

On August 24, 1912, the army's Quartermaster, Subsistence and Pay Departments were merged into the Quartermaster Corps. The new corps contained the enlisted ranks of Master Electrician, Quartermaster Sergeant, Quartermaster Corps, Sergeant First Class, Sergeant, Corporal, Cook, Private First Class and Private. The old ranks of Post Quartermaster Sergeant and Post Commissary Sergeant were eliminated.

It is not clear when insignia was prescribed.

| | | | | | | No Insignia |
| Master Electrician Quartermaster Corps | Quartermaster Sergeant, Quartermaster Corps | Sergeant Quartermaster Corps | CorporalQuartermaster Corps | Cook, Quartermaster Corps | Private First ClassQuartermaster Corps | Private Quartermaster Corps |

== US Army Olive Drab Chevrons 1912 ==
| | Regimental Sergeant Major | Sergeant Major Senior Grade | Master Electrician | Master Signal Electrician | Engineer | Electrician Sergeant First Class | Ordnance Sergeant | Quartermaster Sergeant, Quartermaster Corps | Sergeant First Class | Electrician Sergeant Second Class | Master Gunner | Regimental Quartermaster Sergeant | Regimental Commissary Sergeant | Chief Musician | Squadron Sergeant Major | Battalion Sergeant Major | Sergeant Major Junior Grade | Color Sergeant | Chief Trumpeter | Principal Musician | Battalion Quartermaster Sergeant | First Sergeant | Drum Major | ! class="nowrap ts-vertical-header " style="" | Band Sergeant and Assistant Leader | Sergeant of Field Music | Sergeant | Company/Battery/Troop Quartermaster Sergeant | Stable Sergeant | Corporal | Fireman | Cook | Acting Cook | Ferrier | Horseshoer | Saddler | Wagoner | Trumpeter | Chief Mechanic | Mechanic | Musician | Artificer | Private Serving as Lance Corporal | Private First Class | Private Second Class | Privates |
|---|---|---|---|---|---|---|---|---|---|---|---|---|---|---|---|---|---|---|---|---|---|---|---|---|---|---|---|---|---|---|---|---|---|---|---|---|---|---|---|---|---|---|---|---|---|
| Quartermaster Corps | | | | | | | | | | | | | | | | | | | | | | | | | | | | | | | | | | | | | | | | | | | | | No Insignia |
| Medical Department | | | | | | | | | | | | | | | | | | | | | | | | | | | | | | | | | | | | | | | | | | | | | No Insignia |
| Corps of Engineers | | | | | | | | | | | | | | | | | | | | | | | | | | | | | | | | | | | | | | | | No Insignia | | | | No Insignia | No Insignia |
| Ordnance Department | | | | | | | | | | | | | | | | | | | | | | | | | | | | | | | | | | | | | | | | | | | | No Insignia | |
| Signal Corps | | | | | | | | | | | | | | | | | | | | | | | | | | | | | | | | | | | | | | | | | | | | | No Insignia |
| Cavalry | | | | | | | | | | | | | | | | | | | | | | | | | | | | | | | | | | | | | No Insignia | | | | | | | | No Insignia |
| Field Artillery | | | | | | | | | | | | | | | | | | | | | | | | | | | | | | | | | | | | | | | | No Insignia | | | | | No Insignia |
| Coast Artillery Corps | | | | | | | | | | | | | | | | | | | | | | | | | | | | | | | | | | | | | | | | No Insignia | | | | | No Insignia |
| Infantry | | | | | | | | | | | | | | | | | | | | | | | | | | | | | | | | | | | | | | | | No Insignia | | | | | No Insignia |
| Military Academy | | | | | | | | | | | | | | | | | | | | | | | | | | | | | | | | | | | | | | | | No Insignia | | | | | No Insignia |
| Service School Detachments | | | | | | | | | | | | | | | | | | | | | | | | | | | | | | | | | | | | | | | | | | | | | No Insignia |

In 1913 the denim chevrons were extended to the Quartermaster's Department.

== US Army Olive Drab Chevrons 1913 ==
| | Regimental Sergeant Major | Sergeant Major Senior Grade | Master Electrician | Master Signal Electrician | Engineer | Electrician Sergeant First Class | Ordnance Sergeant | Quartermaster Sergeant, Quartermaster Corps | Sergeant First Class | Electrician Sergeant Second Class | Master Gunner | Regimental Quartermaster Sergeant | Regimental Commissary Sergeant | Chief Musician | Squadron Sergeant Major | Battalion Sergeant Major | Sergeant Major Junior Grade | Color Sergeant | Chief Trumpeter | Principal Musician | Battalion Quartermaster Sergeant | First Sergeant | Drum Major | Band Sergeant and Assistant Leader | Sergeant of Field Music | Sergeant | Company/Battery/Troop Quartermaster Sergeant | Stable Sergeant | Corporal | Fireman | Cook | Acting Cook | Ferrier | Horseshoer | Saddler | Wagoner | Trumpeter | Chief Mechanic | Mechanic | Musician | Artificer | Private Serving as Lance Corporal | Private First Class | Private Second Class | Privates |
|---|---|---|---|---|---|---|---|---|---|---|---|---|---|---|---|---|---|---|---|---|---|---|---|---|---|---|---|---|---|---|---|---|---|---|---|---|---|---|---|---|---|---|---|---|---|
| Quartermaster Corps | | | | | | | | | | | | | | | | | | | | | | | | | | | | | | | | | | | | | | | | | | | | | No Insignia |
| Medical Department | | | | | | | | | | | | | | | | | | | | | | | | | | | | | | | | | | | | | | | | | | | | | No Insignia |
| Corps of Engineers | | | | | | | | | | | | | | | | | | | | | | | | | | | | | | | | | | | | | | | | No Insignia | | | | No Insignia | No Insignia |
| Ordnance Department | | | | | | | | | | | | | | | | | | | | | | | | | | | | | | | | | | | | | | | | | | | | No Insignia | |
| Signal Corps | | | | | | | | | | | | | | | | | | | | | | | | | | | | | | | | | | | | | | | | | | | | | No Insignia |
| Cavalry | | | | | | | | | | | | | | | | | | | | | | | | | | | | | | | | | | | | | No Insignia | | | | | | | | No Insignia |
| Field Artillery | | | | | | | | | | | | | | | | | | | | | | | | | | | | | | | | | | | | | | | | No Insignia | | | | | No Insignia |
| Coast Artillery Corps | | | | | | | | | | | | | | | | | | | | | | | | | | | | | | | | | | | | | | | | No Insignia | | | | | No Insignia |
| Infantry | | | | | | | | | | | | | | | | | | | | | | | | | | | | | | | | | | | | | | | | No Insignia | | | | | No Insignia |
| Military Academy | | | | | | | | | | | | | | | | | | | | | | | | | | | | | | | | | | | | | No Insignia | | | No Insignia | | | | | No Insignia |
| Service School Detachments | | | | | | | | | | | | | | | | | | | | | | | | | | | | | | | | | | | | | | | | | | | | | No Insignia |

In 1914 the insignia for Firemen was changed to three chevrons, one arc and a governor.

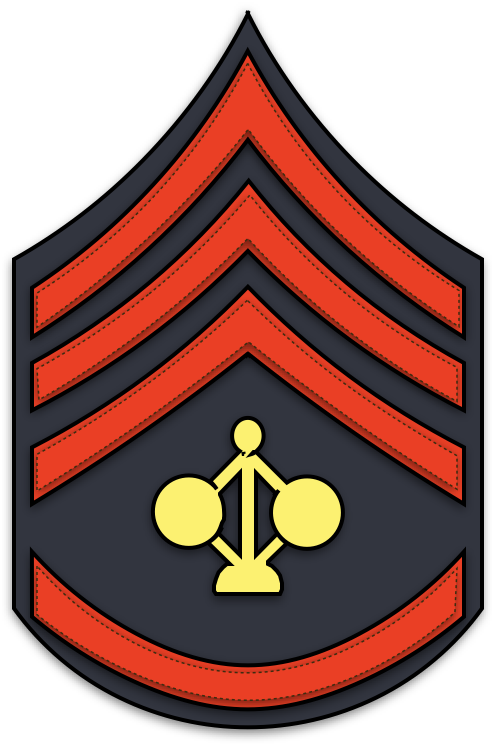
Fireman

Denim chevrons were authorized for the Signal Corps.

== US Army Olive Drab Chevrons 1914 ==
| | Regimental Sergeant Major | Sergeant Major Senior Grade | Master Electrician | Master Signal Electrician | Engineer | Electrician Sergeant First Class | Ordnance Sergeant | Quartermaster Sergeant, Quartermaster Corps | Sergeant First Class | Electrician Sergeant Second Class | Master Gunner | Regimental Quartermaster Sergeant | Regimental Commissary Sergeant | Chief Musician | Squadron Sergeant Major | Battalion Sergeant Major | Sergeant Major Junior Grade | Color Sergeant | Chief Trumpeter | Principal Musician | Battalion Quartermaster Sergeant | First Sergeant | Drum Major | Band Sergeant and Assistant Leader | Sergeant of Field Music | Sergeant | Company/Battery/Troop Quartermaster Sergeant | Stable Sergeant | Corporal | Fireman | Cook | Acting Cook | Ferrier | Horseshoer | Saddler | Wagoner | Trumpeter | Chief Mechanic | Mechanic | Musician | Artificer | Private Serving as Lance Corporal | Private First Class | Private Second Class | Private |
|---|---|---|---|---|---|---|---|---|---|---|---|---|---|---|---|---|---|---|---|---|---|---|---|---|---|---|---|---|---|---|---|---|---|---|---|---|---|---|---|---|---|---|---|---|---|
| Quartermaster Corps | | | | | | | | | | | | | | | | | | | | | | | | | | | | | | | | | | | | | | | | | | | | | No Insignia |
| Medical Department | | | | | | | | | | | | | | | | | | | | | | | | | | | | | | | | | | | | | | | | | | | | | No Insignia |
| Corps of Engineers | | | | | | | | | | | | | | | | | | | | | | | | | | | | | | | | | | | | | | | | No Insignia | | | | No Insignia | No Insignia |
| Ordnance Department | | | | | | | | | | | | | | | | | | | | | | | | | | | | | | | | | | | | | | | | | | | | No Insignia | |
| Signal Corps | | | | | | | | | | | | | | | | | | | | | | | | | | | | | | | | | | | | | | | | | | | | | No Insignia |
| Cavalry | | | | | | | | | | | | | | | | | | | | | | | | | | | | | | | | | | | | | No Insignia | | | | | | | | No Insignia |
| Field Artillery | | | | | | | | | | | | | | | | | | | | | | | | | | | | | | | | | | | | | | | | No Insignia | | | | | No Insignia |
| Coast Artillery Corps | | | | | | | | | | | | | | | | | | | | | | | | | | | | | | | | | | | | | | | | No Insignia | | | | | No Insignia |
| Infantry | | | | | | | | | | | | | | | | | | | | | | | | | | | | | | | | | | | | | | | | No Insignia | | | | | No Insignia |
| Military Academy | | | | | | | | | | | | | | | | | | | | | | | | | | | | | | | | | | | | | | | | No Insignia | | | | | No Insignia |
| Service School Detachments | | | | | | | | | | | | | | | | | | | | | | | | | | | | | | | | | | | | | | | | | | | | | No Insignia |

== US Army Olive Drab Chevrons 1915 ==
| | Regimental Sergeant Major | Sergeant Major Senior Grade | Master Electrician | Master Signal Electrician | Engineer | Electrician Sergeant First Class | Ordnance Sergeant | Quartermaster Sergeant, Quartermaster Corps | Sergeant First Class | Electrician Sergeant Second Class | Master Gunner | Regimental Quartermaster Sergeant | Regimental Commissary Sergeant | Chief Musician | Squadron Sergeant Major | Battalion Sergeant Major | Sergeant Major Junior Grade | Color Sergeant | Chief Trumpeter | Principal Musician | Battalion Quartermaster Sergeant | First Sergeant | Drum Major | Band Sergeant and Assistant Leader | Sergeant of Field Music | Sergeant | Company/Battery/Troop Quartermaster Sergeant | Stable Sergeant | Corporal | Fireman | Cook | Acting Cook | Ferrier | Horseshoer | Saddler | Wagoner | Trumpeter | Chief Mechanic | Mechanic | Musician | Artificer | Private Serving as Lance Corporal | Private First Class | Private Second Class | Privates |
|---|---|---|---|---|---|---|---|---|---|---|---|---|---|---|---|---|---|---|---|---|---|---|---|---|---|---|---|---|---|---|---|---|---|---|---|---|---|---|---|---|---|---|---|---|---|
| Quartermaster Corps | | | | | | | | | | | | | | | | | | | | | | | | | | | | | | | | | | | | | | | | | | | | | No Insignia |
| Medical Department | | | | | | | | | | | | | | | | | | | | | | | | | | | | | | | | | | | | | | | | | | | | | No Insignia |
| Corps of Engineers | | | | | | | | | | | | | | | | | | | | | | | | | | | | | | | | | | | | | | | | No Insignia | | | | No Insignia | No Insignia |
| Ordnance Department | | | | | | | | | | | | | | | | | | | | | | | | | | | | | | | | | | | | | | | | | | | | No Insignia | |
| Signal Corps | | | | | | | | | | | | | | | | | | | | | | | | | | | | | | | | | | | | | | | | | | | | | No Insignia |
| Cavalry | | | | | | | | | | | | | | | | | | | | | | | | | | | | | | | | | | | | | No Insignia | | | | | | | | No Insignia |
| Field Artillery | | | | | | | | | | | | | | | | | | | | | | | | | | | | | | | | | | | | | | | | No Insignia | | | | | No Insignia |
| Coast Artillery Corps | | | | | | | | | | | | | | | | | | | | | | | | | | | | | | | | | | | | | | | | No Insignia | | | | | No Insignia |
| Infantry | | | | | | | | | | | | | | | | | | | | | | | | | | | | | | | | | | | | | | | | No Insignia | | | | | No Insignia |
| Military Academy | | | | | | | | | | | | | | | | | | | | | | | | | | | | | | | | | | | | | | | | No Insignia | | | | | No Insignia |
| Service School Detachments | | | | | | | | | | | | | | | | | | | | | | | | | | | | | | | | | | | | | | | | No Insignia | | | | | No Insignia |

The army was reorganized by the National Defense Act of June 3, 1916.

Regimental Quartermaster Sergeants became Regimental Supply Sergeants. Battalion Quartermaster Sergeants in the Corps of Engineers became Battalion Supply Sergeants, those in the field artillery were abolished. Company level Quartermaster Sergeants became Supply Sergeants. Regimental Commissary Sergeants were abolished.

Artificers in the infantry were converted to mechanics and they were added to the cavalry and Medical Department.

Bands in the infantry, cavalry, field artillery, Coast Artillery Corps and the Corps of Engineers were reorganized. This eliminated the ranks of Chief Musician, Chief Trumpeter, Principal Musician and Drum Major. They were replaced with the ranks of Band Leader, Assistant Band Leader, Band Sergeant and Band Corporal. The First Sergeant of the headquarters company or troop in the infantry and cavalry served as drum major. Band musicians were divided into three classes. Musicians and Trumpeters in field units became Buglers. A rank of Sergeant Bugler was added to the infantry, cavalry field artillery and engineers.

| | | | | | No Insignia | No Insignia | No Insignia | | No Insignia |
| Band Leader Infantry | Assistant Band Leader Infantry | First Sergeant Drum Major Infantry | Band Sergeant Infantry | Band Corporal Infantry | Musician First Class Infantry | Musician Second Class Infantry | Musician Third Class Infantry | Sergeant Bugler Infantry | Bugler Infantry |
| | | | | | No Insignia | No Insignia | No Insignia | | No Insignia |
| Band Leader Cavalry | Assistant Band Leader Cavalry | First Sergeant Drum Major Cavalry | Band Sergeant Cavalry | Band Corporal Cavalry | Musician First Class Cavalry | Musician Second Class Cavalry | Musician Third Class Cavalry | Sergeant Bugler Cavalry | Bugler Cavalry |
| | | | | | No Insignia | No Insignia | No Insignia | | No Insignia |
| Band Leader Coast Artillery Corps | Assistant Band Leader Coast Artillery Corps | | Band Sergeant Coast Artillery Corps | Band Corporal Coast Artillery Corps | Musician First Class Coast Artillery Corps | Musician Second Class Coast Artillery Corps | Musician Third Class Coast Artillery Corps | Sergeant Bugler Coast Artillery Corps | Bugler Coast Artillery Corps |
| | | | | | No Insignia | No Insignia | No Insignia | | No Insignia |
| Band Leader Field Artillery | Assistant Band Leader Field Artillery | | Band Sergeant Field Artillery | Band Corporal Field Artillery | Musician First Class Field Artillery | Musician Second Class Field Artillery | Musician Third Class Field Artillery | Sergeant Bugler Field Artillery | Bugler Field Artillery |
| | | | | | No Insignia | No Insignia | No Insignia | | No Insignia |
| Band Leader Corps of Engineers | Assistant Band Leader Corps of Engineers | | Band Sergeant Corps of Engineers | Band Corporal Corps of Engineers | Musician First Class Corps of Engineers | Musician Second Class Corps of Engineers | Musician Third Class Corps of Engineers | Sergeant Bugler Corps of Engineers | Bugler Corps of Engineers |

Farriers were eliminated from the cavalry and field artillery but were added to the Medical Department. Saddlers and Wagoners were authorized for the infantry and field artillery. Stable Sergeants were authorized in the infantry and field artillery. Horseshoers were authorized in the infantry.

A new rank of Mess Sergeant was authorized in the cavalry, infantry, field artillery, Coast Artillery Corps and the Corps of Engineers.

| Mess Sergeant Infantry | Mess Sergeant Cavalry | Mess Sergeant Field Artillery | Mess Sergeant Coast Artillery Corps | Mess Sergeant Infantry Corps of Engineers |

Master Electricians in the Quartermaster Corps were replaced with Quartermaster Sergeants Senior Grade.

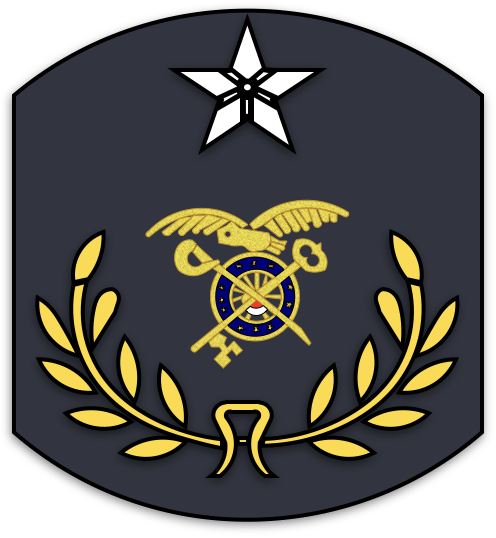
Quartermaster Sergeant Senior Grade Quartermaster Corps

The Medical Department added the new ranks of Master Hospital Sergeant and Hospital Sergeant and was authorized the ranks of horseshoer and saddler.

The Corps of Engineers added the new ranks of Master Engineer Senior Grade and Master Engineer Junior Grade. The Corps of Engineers was also now authorized the ranks of Regimental Sergeant Major, Color Sergeant, Stable Sergeant, Sergeant First Class, Horseshoer, Saddler and Wagoner. The rank of Private Second Class was eliminated.

| Master Engineer Senior Grade Corps of Engineers | Master Engineer Junior Grade Corps of Engineers | Sergeant First Class Corps of Engineers |

The Coast Artillery Corp added the new ranks of Assistant Engineer and Radio Sergeant.

| Assistant Engineer Coast Artillery Corps | Radio Sergeant Coast Artillery Corps |

The Signal Corps added the new rank of Aviator and were authorized Horseshoers.

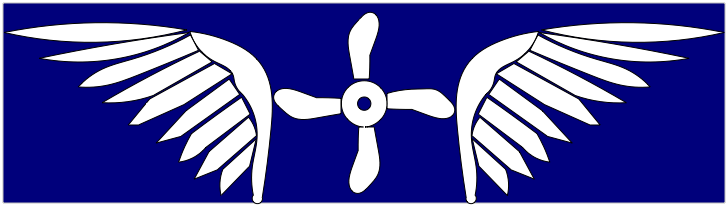
Aviator Signal Corps

The rank of Private First Class was added to the infantry, cavalry, field artillery and Coast Artillery Corps. This eliminated the need for privates to serve as Lance Corporals. The only Lance Corporals left were in the West Point service detachment.

| Private First Class Infantry | Private First ClassCavalry | Private First Class Field Artillery | Private First Class Coast Artillery Corps |

Insignia was probably prescribed by Change No. 6 to Uniform Specifications on October 12, 1916.

== US Army Olive Drab Chevrons 1916 ==
| | Aviator | Regimental Sergeant Major | Sergeant Major, Senior Grade | Quartermaster Sergeant, Senior Grade, Quartermaster Corps | Master Hospital Sergeant | Master Engineer Senior Grade | Master Electrician | Master Signal Electrician | Band Leader | Hospital Sergeant | Master Engineer Junior Grade | Engineer | Ordnance Sergeant | Quartermaster Sergeant, Quartermaster Corps | Regimental Supply Sergeant | Squadron /Battalion Sergeant Major | Sergeant Major Junior Grade | Supply Sergeant, Battalion | First Sergeant | First Sergeant (Drum Major) | Sergeant First Class | Electrician Sergeant First Class | Assistant Engineer | Master Gunner | Band Sergeant and Assistant Leader, United States Military Academy Band | Assistant Band Leader | Sergeant Bugler | Electrician Sergeant Second Class | Radio Sergeant | Color Sergeant | Sergeant | Supply Sergeant | Mess Sergeant | Stable Sergeant | Fireman | Corporal | Band Corporal | Cook | Farrier | Horseshoer | Saddler | Wagoner | Bugler | Chief Mechanic | Mechanic | Musician First Class | Musician Second Class | Musician Third Class | Private Serving as Lance Corporal | Private First Class Class | Private Second Class | Private |
|---|---|---|---|---|---|---|---|---|---|---|---|---|---|---|---|---|---|---|---|---|---|---|---|---|---|---|---|---|---|---|---|---|---|---|---|---|---|---|---|---|---|---|---|---|---|---|---|---|---|---|---|---|
| Quartermaster Corps | | | | | | | | | | | | | | | | | | | | | | | | | | | | | | | | | | | | | | | | | | | | | | | | | | | | No Insignia |
| Medical Department | | | | | | | | | | | | | | | | | | | | | | | | | | | | | | | | | | | | | | | | | | | | | | | | | | | | No Insignia |
| Corps of Engineers | | | | | | | | | | | | | | | | | | | | | | | | | | | | | | | | | | | | | | | | | | | No Insignia | | | No Insignia | No Insignia | No Insignia | | | | No Insignia |
| Ordnance Department | | | | | | | | | | | | | | | | | | | | | | | | | | | | | | | | | | | | | | | | | | | | | | | | | | | No Insignia | |
| Signal Corps | | | | | | | | | | | | | | | | | | | | | | | | | | | | | | | | | | | | | | | | | | | | | | | | | | | | No Insignia |
| Cavalry | | | | | | | | | | | | | | | | | | | | | | | | | | | | | | | | | | | | | | | | | | | No Insignia | | | No Insignia | No Insignia | No Insignia | | | | No Insignia |
| Field Artillery | | | | | | | | | | | | | | | | | | | | | | | | | | | | | | | | | | | | | | | | | | | No Insignia | | | No Insignia | No Insignia | No Insignia | | | | No Insignia |
| Coast Artillery Corps | | | | | | | | | | | | | | | | | | | | | | | | | | | | | | | | | | | | | | | | | | | No Insignia | | | No Insignia | No Insignia | No Insignia | | | | No Insignia |
| Infantry | | | | | | | | | | | | | | | | | | | | | | | | | | | | | | | | | | | | | | | | | | | No Insignia | | | No Insignia | No Insignia | No Insignia | | | | No Insignia |
| Military Academy | | | | | | | | | | | | | | | | | | | | | | | | | | | | | | | | | | | | | | | | | | | | | | No Insignia | No Insignia | No Insignia | | | | No Insignia |
| Service School Detachments | | | | | | | | | | | | | | | | | | | | | | | | | | | | | | | | | | | | | | | | | | | No Insignia | | | | | | | | | No Insignia |

The entry of the United States into the First World War had a great effect on the army's structure and insignia.

The insignia for Firemen of the Coast Artillery Corps was changed to an arc under a governor.

On April 12, 1917, use of the dress blue uniform was suspended. This left only the olive drab chevrons and the medical white chevrons.

On May 18, 1917, the President was given the authority to reorganize the army as was necessary in order to prosecute the war.

On July 5, 1917, a Gas Service was established. A table in the annual report of the chief of the service states that the ranks used in 1917 were Sergeant First Class, Sergeant, Corporal and Private First Class.

On July 14, 1917, the authority was used to create a Corps of Interpreters. It appears the only enlisted men in the corps were sergeants.

On July 24, 1917, the ranks of Chauffeur First Class and Chauffeur were added to the Signal Corps by law.

On August 6, 1917, Sergeants First Class were added to the Ordnance Department.

A Corps of Intelligence Police was created on August 13, 1917, once again it appears the only enlisted men were sergeants.

Insignia was prescribed on December 29, 1917. Sergeants First Class of the Ordnance Department were given three chevrons, one tie and a bursting bomb. Chauffeurs are not mentioned. The insignia for Band Leaders was changed to three chevrons, three arcs and a lyre. Assistant Band Leaders wore two arcs and Sergeant Buglers one arc. Lyres were placed under the chevrons of Band Sergeants and Band Corporals, and musicians wore the lyre by itself. Buglers wore a bugle.

Insignia for a Tank "Service" is prescribed by the change, but it appears the Tank Corps was not organized until the following year.

== US Army Olive Drab Chevrons 1917 ==
| | Aviator | Regimental Sergeant Major | Sergeant Major, Senior Grade | Quartermaster Sergeant, Senior Grade, Quartermaster Corps | Master Hospital Sergeant | Master Engineer Senior Grade | Master Electrician | Master Signal Electrician | Band Leader | Hospital Sergeant | Master Engineer Junior Grade | Engineer | Ordnance Sergeant | Quartermaster Sergeant, Quartermaster Corps | Regimental Supply Sergeant | Squadron /Battalion Sergeant Major | Sergeant Major Junior Grade | Supply Sergeant, Battalion | First Sergeant | First Sergeant (Drum Major) | Sergeant First Class | Chauffeur First Class | Electrician Sergeant First Class | Assistant Engineer | Master Gunner | Band Sergeant and Assistant Leader, United States Military Academy Band | Assistant Band Leader | Sergeant Bugler | Electrician Sergeant Second Class | Radio Sergeant | Color Sergeant | Sergeant | Chauffeur | Supply Sergeant | Mess Sergeant | Stable Sergeant | Fireman | Corporal | Band Corporal | Cook | Farrier | Horseshoer | Saddler | Wagoner | Bugler | Chief Mechanic | Mechanic | Musician First Class | Musician Second Class | Musician Third Class | Private Serving as Lance Corporal | Private First Class Class | Private Second Class | Private |
|---|---|---|---|---|---|---|---|---|---|---|---|---|---|---|---|---|---|---|---|---|---|---|---|---|---|---|---|---|---|---|---|---|---|---|---|---|---|---|---|---|---|---|---|---|---|---|---|---|---|---|---|---|---|---|
| Quartermaster Corps | | | | | | | | | | | | | | | | | | | | | | | | | | | | | | | | | | | | | | | | | | | | | | | | | | | | | | No Insignia |
| Medical Department | | | | | | | | | | | | | | | | | | | | | | | | | | | | | | | | | | | | | | | | | | | | | | | | | | | | | | No Insignia |
| Corps of Engineers | | | | | | | | | | | | | | | | | | | | | | | | | | | | | | | | | | | | | | | | | | | | | | | | | | | | | | No Insignia |
| Ordnance Department | | | | | | | | | | | | | | | | | | | | | | | | | | | | | | | | | | | | | | | | | | | | | | | | | | | | | No Insignia | |
| Signal Corps | | | | | | | | | | | | | | | | | | | | | | No Insignia | | | | | | | | | | | No Insignia | | | | | | | | | | | | | | | | | | | | | No Insignia |
| Gas Service | | | | | | | | | | | | | | | | | | | | | | | | | | | | | | | | | | | | | | | | | | | | | | | | | | | | | | |
| Corps of Intelligence Police | | | | | | | | | | | | | | | | | | | | | | | | | | | | | | | | | | | | | | | | | | | | | | | | | | | | | | |
| Corps of Interpreters | | | | | | | | | | | | | | | | | | | | | | | | | | | | | | | | | | | | | | | | | | | | | | | | | | | | | | |
| Cavalry | | | | | | | | | | | | | | | | | | | | | | | | | | | | | | | | | | | | | | | | | | | | | | | | | | | | | | No Insignia |
| Field Artillery | | | | | | | | | | | | | | | | | | | | | | | | | | | | | | | | | | | | | | | | | | | | | | | | | | | | | | No Insignia |
| Coast Artillery Corps | | | | | | | | | | | | | | | | | | | | | | | | | | | | | | | | | | | | | | | | | | | | | | | | | | | | | | No Insignia |
| Infantry | | | | | | | | | | | | | | | | | | | | | | | | | | | | | | | | | | | | | | | | | | | | | | | | | | | | | | No Insignia |
| Military Academy | | | | | | | | | | | | | | | | | | | | | | | | | | | | | | | | | | | | | | | | | | | | | | | | | | | | | | No Insignia |
| Service School Detachments | | | | | | | | | | | | | | | | | | | | | | | | | | | | | | | | | | | | | | | | | | | | | | | | | | | | | | No Insignia |

The Tank Corps was created at some point in early 1918. It contained the enlisted ranks of Master Engineer Senior Grade, Sergeant First Class, Sergeant, Corporal, Cook, Private First Class and Private.

On February 19, 1918, regulations finally acknowledged that denim chevrons were stitched.

In April the olive drab chevrons were prescribed for the medical white uniform.

On May 7, 1918, the army issued Change No. 4 to Special Regulation 42 (Uniform Specifications). Unlike earlier versions, insignia is prescribed for "General Application" instead of branch by branch. The biggest change is the elimination of branch specific insignia for Sergeants First Class, Sergeants and Corporals. Any branch insignia worn under the chevrons was to be removed. Supply Sergeants were to add a tie to their chevrons, returning them to the insignia they wore when they were Company Quartermaster Sergeants. Mess Sergeants added a cooks cap under their chevrons, and stable sergeants regained the horses head they had lost in 1916. Band Leaders now wore a lyre in a wreath under a star and Assistant Band Leaders wore the same without the star. Corporal Buglers wore two chevrons and a bugle and Buglers First Class a bugle over a bar, despite it being two months before those ranks were created. Electrician Sergeants of both classes replaced their wreaths with arcs and Radio Sergeants lost their arc. Hospital Sergeants now wore a caduceus in a wreath. Chief Mechanics replaced the wreath with a bar. Ordnance Sergeants now wore a bursting bomb in a wreath. Master Signal Electricians now wore the full insignia of the corps in a wreath under a star. Privates First Class at West Point and at service schools now wore a hammer crossed with a quill, those at general headquarters a wreath and those in the General Recruiting Service a shield. Quartermaster Sergeants, Quartermaster Corps now wore the corps insignia in a wreath.

Insignia was prescribed for chauffeurs of a car tire and wheel over an arc for Chauffeurs First Class and over a bar for Chauffeurs. The wheel by itself was to be worn by Assistant Chauffeurs and under three chevrons by Motor Sergeants. There was a bill before congress that would have created the ranks of Assistant Chauffeur and Motor Sergeant and just as insignia was prescribed for Corporal Buglers and Buglers First Class the order may have been anticipating this bill. The bill did not pass. Change 4 does state " Chauffeurs may be in any arm of the Service . See Tables of Organization ". A check of the Tables of Organization shows that Chauffeur was a duty assignment of a Private First Class, and Assistant Chauffeur of Privates in division trains and units of the Coast Artillery Corps. They are listed as Privates First Class or Privates with chauffeur duties marked by a footnote. Chauffeur First Class and Chauffeur are shown as ranks in Signal Corps Units.

The Tank Corps insignia was to be a tank. Three different designs of tank were used at various times during the war.

| Master Engineer Senior Grade | Private First Class |

On May 24, 1918, the Aviation Section of the Signal Corps was separated into the Air Service.

On June 28, 1918, the Gas Service became the Chemical Warfare Service. As of July 13, 1918 the authorized enlisted ranks were Master Engineer Senior Grade, Master Engineer Junior Grade, Regimental Sergeant Major, Regimental Supply Sergeant, Battalion Sergeant Major, Battalion Supply Sergeant, First Sergeant, Sergeant First Class, Mess Sergeant, Supply Sergeant, Sergeant, Corporal, Bugler, Cook, Mechanic, Wagoner, Private First Class and Private. Stable Sergeants, Horseshoers and Saddlers were added on October 30, 1918. Not on this list is the rank of Master Chemical Sergeant that has been listed among the ranks of the service. There are no contemporary references to such a rank. It may have been confused with Senior Engineer Senior Grade.

On July 9, 1918, a Mine Planter Service was added to the Coast Artillery Corps. Its purpose was to lay sea mines, therefore crews for boats had to be provided. This added the nautical ranks of Oiler, Deckhand, Steward and Assistant Steward to the Army. The same law added the ranks of Corporal Bugler and Bugler First Class to the Corps of Engineers, cavalry, infantry, field artillery and Coast Artillery Corps.

Enlisted men were added to the Judge Advocate General's Department on July 12, 1918. Enlisted ranks of Regimental Sergeant Major, Battalion Sergeant Major, Sergeant and Corporal were authorized.

On August 14, 1918, chevrons were restricted to the right sleeve only.

On August 15, 1918, a Motor Transport Corps was added. Enlisted ranks authorized were Master Engineer Senior Grade, First Sergeant, Sergeant First Class, Sergeant, Corporal, Cook, Private First Class and Private.

== US Army Olive Drab Chevrons 1918 ==
| | Aviator | Regimental Sergeant Major | Sergeant Major Senior Grade | Quartermaster Sergeant, Senior Grade | Master Hospital Sergeant | Master Engineer Senior Grade | Master Electrician | Master signal Electrician | Band Leader | Hospital Sergeant | Master Engineer Junior Grade | Engineer | Ordnance Sergeant | Quartermaster Sergeant, Quartermaster Corps | Supply Sergeant, Regimental | Battalion Sergeant Major | Sergeant Major Junior Grade | Supply Sergeant, Battalion | First Sergeant | First Sergeant (Drum Major) | Sergeant First Class | Chauffeur first Class | Electrician Sergeant First Class | Assistant Engineer | Master Gunner | Band sergeant and assistant leader | Assistant Band Leader | Sergeant Bugler | Oiler, Mine Planter Service | Steward, Mine Planter Service | Electrician Sergeant Second Class | Radio Sergeant | Color Sergeant | Sergeant | Chauffeur | Supply Sergeant | Mess Sergeant | Stable Sergeant | Sergeant of Field Music | Band Sergeant | Fireman | Fireman, Mine Planter Service | Corporal | Corporal Bugler | Band Corporal | Cook | Farrier | Horseshoer | Saddler | Wagoner | Chief Mechanic | Mechanic | Assistant Steward, Mine Planter Service | Bugler First Class | Bugler | Private serving as Lance Corporal | Assistant Chauffeur | Musician First Class | Musician Second Class | Musician Third Class | Deckhand, Mine Planter Service | Private First Class | Private Second Class | Private |
|---|---|---|---|---|---|---|---|---|---|---|---|---|---|---|---|---|---|---|---|---|---|---|---|---|---|---|---|---|---|---|---|---|---|---|---|---|---|---|---|---|---|---|---|---|---|---|---|---|---|---|---|---|---|---|---|---|---|---|---|---|---|---|---|---|
| General Headquarters | | | | | | | | | | | | | | | | | | | | | | | | | | | | | | | | | | | | | | | | | | | | | | | | | | | | | | | | | | | | | | | | No Insignia |
| Judge Advocate General's Department | | | | | | | | | | | | | | | | | | | | | | | | | | | | | | | | | | | | | | | | | | | | | | | | | | | | | | | | | | | | | | | | |
| Quartermaster Corps | | | | | | | | | | | | | | | | | | | | | | | | | | | | | | | | | | | | | | | | | | | | | | | | | | | | | | | | | | | | | | | | No Insignia |
| Medical Department | | | | | | | | | | | | | | | | | | | | | | | | | | | | | | | | | | | | | | | | | | | | | | | | | | | | | | | | | | | | | | | | No Insignia |
| Corps of Engineers | | | | | | | | | | | | | | | | | | | | | | | | | | | | | | | | | | | | | | | | | | | | | | | | | | | | | | | | | | | | | | | | No Insignia |
| Chemical Warfare Service | | | | | | | | | | | | | | | | | | | | | | | | | | | | | | | | | | | | | | | | | | | | | | | | | | | | | | | | | | | | | | | | No Insignia |
| Ordnance Department | | | | | | | | | | | | | | | | | | | | | | | | | | | | | | | | | | | | | | | | | | | | | | | | | | | | | | | | | | | | | | | No Insignia | |
| Signal corps | | | | | | | | | | | | | | | | | | | | | | | | | | | | | | | | | | | | | | | | | | | | | | | | | | | | | | | | | | | | | | | | No Insignia |
| Air Service | | | | | | | | | | | | | | | | | | | | | | | | | | | | | | | | | | | | | | | | | | | | | | | | | | | | | | | | | | | | | | | | No Insignia |
| Tank Corps | | | | | | | | | | | | | | | | | | | | | | | | | | | | | | | | | | | | | | | | | | | | | | | | | | | | | | | | | | | | | | | | No Insignia |
| Motor Transport Corps | | | | | | | | | | | | | | | | | | | | | | | | | | | | | | | | | | | | | | | | | | | | | | | | | | | | | | | | | | | | | | | | No Insignia |
| Corps of Intelligence Police | | | | | | | | | | | | | | | | | | | | | | | | | | | | | | | | | | | | | | | | | | | | | | | | | | | | | | | | | | | | | | | | |
| Corps of Interpreters | | | | | | | | | | | | | | | | | | | | | | | | | | | | | | | | | | | | | | | | | | | | | | | | | | | | | | | | | | | | | | | | |
| Cavalry | | | | | | | | | | | | | | | | | | | | | | | | | | | | | | | | | | | | | | | | | | | | | | | | | | | | | | | | | | | | | | | | No Insignia |
| Field Artillery | | | | | | | | | | | | | | | | | | | | | | | | | | | | | | | | | | | | | | | | | | | | | | | | | | | | | | | | | | | | | | | | No Insignia |
| Coast Artillery Corps | | | | | | | | | | | | | | | | | | | | | | | | | | | | | No Insignia | No Insignia | | | | | | | | | | | | No Insignia | | | | | | | | | | | No Insignia | | | | | | | | No Insignia | | | No Insignia |
| Infantry | | | | | | | | | | | | | | | | | | | | | | | | | | | | | | | | | | | | | | | | | | | | | | | | | | | | | | | | | | | | | | | | No Insignia |
| Military Academy | | | | | | | | | | | | | | | | | | | | | | | | | | | | | | | | | | | | | | | | | | | | | | | | | | | | | | | | | | | | | | | | No Insignia |
| General Recruiting Service | | | | | | | | | | | | | | | | | | | | | | | | | | | | | | | | | | | | | | | | | | | | | | | | | | | | | | | | | | | | | | | | |
| Service School Detachments | | | | | | | | | | | | | | | | | | | | | | | | | | | | | | | | | | | | | | | | | | | | | | | | | | | | | | | | | | | | | | | | No Insignia |

On January 25, 1919, insignia was prescribed for the Transportation Corps and the Provost Marshal General's Department. Both had existed during the war as departments in the American Expeditionary Force in Europe, but never had been authorized their own insignia. The structure of the military police companies and headquarters in the Provost Marshall's Department was laid out by A.E.F. General Order 180, on October 15, 1918.

| Private First Class Transportation Corps January 25, 1919 to July 26, 1919 | Private First Class Provost Marshal General's January 25, 1919 to July 26, 1919 |

Also in January insignia was prescribed for the Coast Artillery Corps' Mine Planter Service. Oiler's would wear three chevrons and one arc with a three bladed propeller. Firemen would be the same without the arc. Stewards would wear three chevrons and one arc with a red crescent and assistant stewards just the crescent. Deckhands would wear a red sea mine until September when they were given the insignia of a Private First Class.

Deckhand, Mine Planter Service January to September 1919

On July 26, 1919, an arc was prescribed for Privates First Class of all branches.

== US Army Olive Drab Chevrons 1919 ==
| | Aviator | Regimental Sergeant Major | Sergeant Major Senior Grade | Quartermaster Sergeant, Senior Grade | Master Hospital Sergeant | Master Engineer Senior Grade | Master Electrician | Master signal Electrician | Band Leader | Hospital Sergeant | Master Engineer Junior Grade | Engineer | Ordnance Sergeant | Quartermaster Sergeant, Quartermaster Corps | Supply Sergeant, Regimental | Battalion Sergeant Major | Sergeant Major Junior Grade | Supply Sergeant, Battalion | First Sergeant | First Sergeant (Drum Major) | Sergeant First Class | Chauffeur first Class | Electrician Sergeant First Class | Assistant Engineer | Master Gunner | Band sergeant and assistant leader | Assistant Band Leader | Sergeant Bugler | Oiler, Mine Planter Service | Steward, Mine Planter Service | Electrician Sergeant Second Class | Radio Sergeant | Color Sergeant | Sergeant | Chauffeur | Supply Sergeant | Mess Sergeant | Stable Sergeant | Sergeant of Field Music | Band Sergeant | Fireman | Fireman, Mine Planter Service | Corporal | Corporal Bugler | Band Corporal | Cook | Farrier | Horseshoer | Saddler | Wagoner | Chief Mechanic | Mechanic | Assistant Steward, Mine Planter Service | Bugler First Class | Bugle | Private serving as Lance Corporal | Assistant Chauffeur | Musician First Class | Musician Second Class | Musician Third Class | Deckhand, Mine Planter Service | Private First Class | Private Second Class | Private |
|---|---|---|---|---|---|---|---|---|---|---|---|---|---|---|---|---|---|---|---|---|---|---|---|---|---|---|---|---|---|---|---|---|---|---|---|---|---|---|---|---|---|---|---|---|---|---|---|---|---|---|---|---|---|---|---|---|---|---|---|---|---|---|---|---|
| General Headquarters | | | | | | | | | | | | | | | | | | | | | | | | | | | | | | | | | | | | | | | | | | | | | | | | | | | | | | | | | | | | | | | | No Insignia |
| Judge Advocate General's Department | | | | | | | | | | | | | | | | | | | | | | | | | | | | | | | | | | | | | | | | | | | | | | | | | | | | | | | | | | | | | | | | |
| Quartermaster Corps | | | | | | | | | | | | | | | | | | | | | | | | | | | | | | | | | | | | | | | | | | | | | | | | | | | | | | | | | | | | | | | | No Insignia |
| Medical Department | | | | | | | | | | | | | | | | | | | | | | | | | | | | | | | | | | | | | | | | | | | | | | | | | | | | | | | | | | | | | | | | No Insignia |
| Corps of Engineers | | | | | | | | | | | | | | | | | | | | | | | | | | | | | | | | | | | | | | | | | | | | | | | | | | | | | | | | | | | | | | | | No Insignia |
| Chemical Warfare Service | | | | | | | | | | | | | | | | | | | | | | | | | | | | | | | | | | | | | | | | | | | | | | | | | | | | | | | | | | | | | | | | No Insignia |
| Ordnance Department | | | | | | | | | | | | | | | | | | | | | | | | | | | | | | | | | | | | | | | | | | | | | | | | | | | | | | | | | | | | | | | No Insignia | |
| Signal corps | | | | | | | | | | | | | | | | | | | | | | | | | | | | | | | | | | | | | | | | | | | | | | | | | | | | | | | | | | | | | | | | No Insignia |
| Air Service | | | | | | | | | | | | | | | | | | | | | | | | | | | | | | | | | | | | | | | | | | | | | | | | | | | | | | | | | | | | | | | | No Insignia |
| Tank Corps | | | | | | | | | | | | | | | | | | | | | | | | | | | | | | | | | | | | | | | | | | | | | | | | | | | | | | | | | | | | | | | | No Insignia |
| Motor Transport Corps | | | | | | | | | | | | | | | | | | | | | | | | | | | | | | | | | | | | | | | | | | | | | | | | | | | | | | | | | | | | | | | | No Insignia |
| Transportation Corp | | | | | | | | | | | | | | | | | | | | | | | | | | | | | | | | | | | | | | | | | | | | | | | | | | | | | | | | | | | | | | | | No Insignia |
| Provost Marshal General's Department | | | | | | | | | | | | | | | | | | | | | | | | | | | | | | | | | | | | | | | | | | | | | | | | | | | | | | | | | | | | | | | | |
| Corps of Intelligence Police | | | | | | | | | | | | | | | | | | | | | | | | | | | | | | | | | | | | | | | | | | | | | | | | | | | | | | | | | | | | | | | | |
| Corps of Interpreters | | | | | | | | | | | | | | | | | | | | | | | | | | | | | | | | | | | | | | | | | | | | | | | | | | | | | | | | | | | | | | | | |
| Cavalry | | | | | | | | | | | | | | | | | | | | | | | | | | | | | | | | | | | | | | | | | | | | | | | | | | | | | | | | | | | | | | | | No Insignia |
| Field Artillery | | | | | | | | | | | | | | | | | | | | | | | | | | | | | | | | | | | | | | | | | | | | | | | | | | | | | | | | | | | | | | | | No Insignia |
| Coast Artillery Corps | | | | | | | | | | | | | | | | | | | | | | | | | | | | | | | | | | | | | | | | | | | | | | | | | | | | | | | | | | | | | | | | No Insignia |
| Infantry | | | | | | | | | | | | | | | | | | | | | | | | | | | | | | | | | | | | | | | | | | | | | | | | | | | | | | | | | | | | | | | | No Insignia |
| Military Academy | | | | | | | | | | | | | | | | | | | | | | | | | | | | | | | | | | | | | | | | | | | | | | | | | | | | | | | | | | | | | | | | No Insignia |
| General Recruiting Service | | | | | | | | | | | | | | | | | | | | | | | | | | | | | | | | | | | | | | | | | | | | | | | | | | | | | | | | | | | | | | | | |
| Service School Detachments | | | | | | | | | | | | | | | | | | | | | | | | | | | | | | | | | | | | | | | | | | | | | | | | | | | | | | | | | | | | | | | | No Insignia |

On January 6, 1920, color was added to several chevrons. The wreaths used by several senior N.C.O ranks were made green and stars white. The lightning of Master Electricians and electrician sergeants was also made white. The lyres for all levels of musician were made yellow. The caduceus for senior medical N.C.O.s was made maroon. The bursting bomb for Ordnance Sergeants was made black with red flames. The shell for Master Gunners and the Governor for engineers in the Coast Artillery Corps were made red. A new insignia was introduced for Quartermaster Sergeants and Master Engineers. Quartermaster sergeants wore a buff colored key crossed with a sword under a white, navy petty officer's eagle, in a green wreath. Engineers wore the same replacing the key and sword with a red wheel. Senior grades added a white star.

None of these new insignias was ever issued. On June 4, 1920 the structure of the army was changed. Enlisted ranks would be in seven grades and no longer be divided by branch.

== US Army Olive Drab Chevrons 1920 ==
| | Aviator | Regimental Sergeant Major | Sergeant Major Senior Grade | Quartermaster Sergeant, Senior Grade | Master Hospital Sergeant | Master Engineer Senior Grade | Master Electrician | Master signal Electrician | Band Leader | Hospital Sergeant | Master Engineer Junior Grade | Engineer | Ordnance Sergeant | Quartermaster Sergeant, Quartermaster Corps | Supply Sergeant, Regimental | Battalion Sergeant Major | Sergeant Major Junior Grade | Supply Sergeant, Battalion | First Sergeant | First Sergeant (Drum Major) | Sergeant First Class | Chauffeur first Class | Electrician Sergeant First Class | Assistant Engineer | Master Gunner | Band sergeant and assistant leader | Assistant Band Leader | Sergeant Bugler | Oiler, Mine Planter Service | Steward, Mine Planter Service | Electrician Sergeant Second Class | Radio Sergeant | Color Sergeant | Sergeant | Chauffeur | Supply Sergeant | Mess Sergeant | Stable Sergeant | Sergeant of Field Music | Band Sergeant | Fireman | Fireman, Mine Planter Service | Corporal | Corporal Bugler | Band Corporal | Cook | Farrier | Horseshoer | Saddler | Wagoner | Chief Mechanic | Mechanic | Assistant Steward, Mine Planter Service | Bugler First Class | Bugler | Private serving as Lance Corporal | Assistant Chauffeur | Musician First Class | Musician Second Class | Musician Third Class | Deckhand, Mine Planter Service | Private First Class | Private Second Class | Private |
|---|---|---|---|---|---|---|---|---|---|---|---|---|---|---|---|---|---|---|---|---|---|---|---|---|---|---|---|---|---|---|---|---|---|---|---|---|---|---|---|---|---|---|---|---|---|---|---|---|---|---|---|---|---|---|---|---|---|---|---|---|---|---|---|---|
| General Headquarters | | | | | | | | | | | | | | | | | | | | | | | | | | | | | | | | | | | | | | | | | | | | | | | | | | | | | | | | | | | | | | | | No Insignia |
| Judge Advocate General's Department | | | | | | | | | | | | | | | | | | | | | | | | | | | | | | | | | | | | | | | | | | | | | | | | | | | | | | | | | | | | | | | | |
| Quartermaster Corps | | | | | | | | | | | | | | | | | | | | | | | | | | | | | | | | | | | | | | | | | | | | | | | | | | | | | | | | | | | | | | | | No Insignia |
| Medical Department | | | | | | | | | | | | | | | | | | | | | | | | | | | | | | | | | | | | | | | | | | | | | | | | | | | | | | | | | | | | | | | | No Insignia |
| Corps of Engineers | | | | | | | | | | | | | | | | | | | | | | | | | | | | | | | | | | | | | | | | | | | | | | | | | | | | | | | | | | | | | | | | No Insignia |
| Chemical Warfare Service | | | | | | | | | | | | | | | | | | | | | | | | | | | | | | | | | | | | | | | | | | | | | | | | | | | | | | | | | | | | | | | | No Insignia |
| Ordnance Department | | | | | | | | | | | | | | | | | | | | | | | | | | | | | | | | | | | | | | | | | | | | | | | | | | | | | | | | | | | | | | | No Insignia | |
| Signal corps | | | | | | | | | | | | | | | | | | | | | | | | | | | | | | | | | | | | | | | | | | | | | | | | | | | | | | | | | | | | | | | | No Insignia |
| Air Service | | | | | | | | | | | | | | | | | | | | | | | | | | | | | | | | | | | | | | | | | | | | | | | | | | | | | | | | | | | | | | | | No Insignia |
| Tank Corps | | | | | | | | | | | | | | | | | | | | | | | | | | | | | | | | | | | | | | | | | | | | | | | | | | | | | | | | | | | | | | | | No Insignia |
| Motor Transport Corps | | | | | | | | | | | | | | | | | | | | | | | | | | | | | | | | | | | | | | | | | | | | | | | | | | | | | | | | | | | | | | | | No Insignia |
| Transportation Corp | | | | | | | | | | | | | | | | | | | | | | | | | | | | | | | | | | | | | | | | | | | | | | | | | | | | | | | | | | | | | | | | No Insignia |
| Corps of Intelligence Police | | | | | | | | | | | | | | | | | | | | | | | | | | | | | | | | | | | | | | | | | | | | | | | | | | | | | | | | | | | | | | | | |
| Corps of Interpreters | | | | | | | | | | | | | | | | | | | | | | | | | | | | | | | | | | | | | | | | | | | | | | | | | | | | | | | | | | | | | | | | |
| Cavalry | | | | | | | | | | | | | | | | | | | | | | | | | | | | | | | | | | | | | | | | | | | | | | | | | | | | | | | | | | | | | | | | No Insignia |
| Field Artillery | | | | | | | | | | | | | | | | | | | | | | | | | | | | | | | | | | | | | | | | | | | | | | | | | | | | | | | | | | | | | | | | No Insignia |
| Coast Artillery Corps | | | | | | | | | | | | | | | | | | | | | | | | | | | | | | | | | | | | | | | | | | | | | | | | | | | | | | | | | | | | | | | | No Insignia |
| Infantry | | | | | | | | | | | | | | | | | | | | | | | | | | | | | | | | | | | | | | | | | | | | | | | | | | | | | | | | | | | | | | | | No Insignia |
| Military Academy | | | | | | | | | | | | | | | | | | | | | | | | | | | | | | | | | | | | | | | | | | | | | | | | | | | | | | | | | | | | | | | | No Insignia |
| General Recruiting Service | | | | | | | | | | | | | | | | | | | | | | | | | | | | | | | | | | | | | | | | | | | | | | | | | | | | | | | | | | | | | | | | |
| Service School Detachments | | | | | | | | | | | | | | | | | | | | | | | | | | | | | | | | | | | | | | | | | | | | | | | | | | | | | | | | | | | | | | | | No Insignia |

The army implemented the new law on June 19, 1920. The new executive authority was used to reduce the large number of ranks in use at the time to eight, plus the specialists.

Grade One was now the rank of Master Sergeant. It was created from the ranks of Regimental Sergeant Major. Sergeant Major Senior Grade, Quartermaster Sergeant Senior Grade, Master Hospital Sergeant, Master Engineer Senior Grade, Master Electrician, Master Signal Electrician, Engineer, Regimental Supply Sergeant, the senior 25% of Ordnance Sergeants, the senior 50% of Master Gunners and the Band Sergeants and Assistant Band Leader of the West Point Band.

Grade Two was now the rank of Technical Sergeant. It came from the ranks of Hospital Sergeant, Master Engineer Junior Grade, the junior 75% of Ordnance Sergeants, Electrician Sergeant First Class, Assistant Engineer, Quartermaster Sergeant and Electrician Sergeants from the Artillery School at West Point. Also in Grade Two the rank of First Sergeant was continued.

Grade Three was now the rank of Staff Sergeant. It came from the ranks ofSquadron or Battalion Sergeant Major, Squadron or Battalion Supply Sergeant, Sergeant Major Junior Grade, Sergeant First Class, the junior 50% of Master Gunners, Assistant Band Leader except from the West Point Band, Sergeant Bugler, Electrician Sergeant, Radio Sergeant, Color Sergeant and Sergeant of Field Music from the West Point Band.

The rank of Sergeant was placed in Grade Four. It absorbed the ranks of Band Sergeant, Stable Sergeant, Mess Sergeant and Supply Sergeant.

The rank of Corporal was placed in Grade Five. It absorbed the ranks of Band Corporal and Corporal Bugler.

The rank of Private First Class was placed in Grade Six, and the rank of Private was placed in grade seven. Within those two grades Musicians First Class in the West Point Band were rated as Specialists First Class. Oilers in the Mine Planter Service were rated as Specialists Second Class. Stewards and Firemen in the Mine Planter Service, Musicians Second Class in the West Point Band and all other Musicians First Class were rated as Specialists Third Class. Chief Mechanics, Horseshoers, Cooks, Musicians Third Class in the West Point Band and all other Musicians Second Class were rated as Specialists Fourth Class. Chauffeurs First Class, Chauffeurs, all other Musicians Third Class, Saddlers, Assistant Stewards and Deck Hands in the Mine Planter Service, Mechanics and Wagoners were rated as Specialists Fifth Class. Buglers First Class and Buglers were rated as Specialists Sixth Class. The ranks of Farrier and Aviator are not listed in the order.

The new ranks were shown by olive drab chevrons on a dark blue background. Master Sergeant's wore three chevrons and three arcs, Technical Sergeants three chevrons and two arcs, First Sergeants three chevrons two arcs and the traditional lozenge, Staff Sergeants three chevrons and one arc, Sergeants three chevrons, Corporals two and Privates First Class one. They were worn on the left sleeve until 1921 when they were placed on both sleeves.

Specialists were to wear the insignia of their grade, one chevron for Grade six or none for Grade Seven. Unofficially many specialists, at least in Grade Six wore one chevron with branch insignia in the angle and one to six arcs.
