= Standing order =

Standing order or standing orders may refer to:

- Standing order (banking) (or banker's order), instruction to a bank to pay a set amount at regular intervals from one account to another
- Parliamentary procedure governing arrangements in an assembly; as opposed to sessional orders or orders of the day
  - Standing orders in the Parliament of the United Kingdom
- General order of unlimited duration, published by a military commander and binding on those commanded
- Collaborative practice agreement, between pharmacists and physicians for collaborative drug therapy management

== See also ==
- Order (disambiguation)
