= Built-in =

Built-in, builtin, or built in may refer to:

== Computing ==
- Shell builtin, a command or a function executed directly in the shell itself
- Builtin function, in computer software and compiler theory

== Other uses ==
- Built-in behavior, of a living organism
- Built-in furniture
- Built-in inflation, a type of inflation that results from past events and persists in the present
- Built-in obsolescence, in industrial design and economics
- Built-in self-test, a mechanism that permits a machine to test itself
- Built-in stabiliser, in macroeconomics

== See also ==
- All pages beginning with "", "" and ""
- All pages with titles containing "", "" and ""
- Built (disambiguation)
- Bulletin (disambiguation)
