= Executive =

Executive (exe., exec., execu.) may refer to:

== Role or title ==
- Executive, a senior management role in an organization
  - Chief executive officer (CEO), one of the highest-ranking corporate officers (executives) or administrators
  - Executive director, job title of the chief executive in many non-profit, government and international organizations; also a description contrasting with non-executive director
  - Executive officer, a high-ranking member of a corporation body, government or military
  - Business executive, a person responsible for running an organization
  - Music executive or record executive, person within a record label who works in senior management
  - Studio executive, employee of a film studio
  - Executive producer, a person who oversees the production of an entertainment product
- Account executive, a job title given by a number of marketing agencies (usually to trainee staff who report to account managers)
- Project executive, a role with the overall responsibility of a project, typically required for larger or more complex projects
- Executive education, term used for programs at graduate-level business schools that aim to educate managers or entrepreneurs

== Function ==
- Executive (government), branch of government that has authority and responsibility for the administration of state bureaucracy
- Executive functions or executive system, theorized cognitive system in psychology that controls and manages other cognitive processes

== Arts, entertainment, and media ==
- Executive (magazine), a Lebanese business monthly
- The Executive, a fictional raincoat in the Seinfeld episode "The Raincoats"
- The Executive, (George Michael § The Executive) a musical band including Andrew Ridgeley and George Michael before the formation of Wham!

== Brands and enterprises ==
- Chrysler Executive, a car offered 1983–1986
- Sinclair Executive, an electronic calculator offered in the early 1970s

== Computing and technology ==
- Executive (operating system), the operating system for the ICL 290x range of computers
- The Windows Executive, internal part of modern Microsoft Windows operating systems

== Other uses ==
- Executive car, in Britain: an automobile larger than a large family car
- Executive paper size (often 7.25 by 10.5 inches (184 mm × 267 mm))

== See also ==
- Executive order (disambiguation), an edict issued by a member of the executive branch of a government
