= Disorder =

Disorder may refer to randomness, a lack of intelligible pattern, or:

== Healthcare ==
- Disorder (medicine), a functional abnormality or disturbance
- Mental disorder or psychological disorder, a psychological pattern associated with distress or disability that occurs in a person and is not a part of normal development or culture:

- Anxiety disorder, different forms of abnormal and pathological fear and anxiety
- Attention-deficit hyperactivity disorder
- Autism spectrum disorder
- Conversion disorder, neurological symptoms such as numbness, blindness, paralysis, or fits, where no neurological explanation is possible
- Obsessive–compulsive disorder, an anxiety disorder characterized by repetitive behaviors aimed at reducing anxiety
- Obsessive–compulsive personality disorder, obsession with perfection, rules, and organization
- Personality disorder, an enduring pattern of inner experience and behavior that deviates markedly from the expectations of the culture of the person who exhibits it

== Law enforcement ==
- Civil disorder, one or more forms of disturbance caused by a group of people
- Lawlessness, a lack of laws or law enforcement

== Science ==
- Crystallographic disorder, disordered atom locations in crystals
- Order and disorder

== Arts, entertainment, and media ==
=== Films ===
- Disorder (1962 film), a film by Franco Brusati
- Disorder (2006 film), a psychological thriller by Jack Thomas Smith
- Disorder (2009 film), a Chinese documentary
- Disorder (2015 film), a French film

=== Music ===
- "Disorder (song)", a song by Joy Division from the 1979 album Unknown Pleasures
- Disorder (EP), an EP by Front Line Assembly
- Disorder (band), a Bristol-based hardcore punk band
- Disorder (album), an album by The Gazette

== Other uses ==
- Dis-order, the mail order service of Displeased Records

== See also ==
- Chaos (disambiguation)
- Order (disambiguation)
