= Executive order (disambiguation) =

An executive order is a directive issued by the head of an executive branch of government.

Executive order may also refer to:

== Government ==
- Executive order (United States), a directive issued by the President of the United States
- Executive order (Philippines), a directive issued by the President of the Philippines
- State executive order, a directive issued by the governor of U.S. state

== Media ==
- Executive Order (film), a 2020 Brazilian film
- Executive Orders, 1996 novel by Tom Clancy

== See also ==
- Executive (disambiguation)
- List of United States federal executive orders
- Order (disambiguation)
- Presidential proclamation (United States)
- Statutory instrument
