= Building (disambiguation) =

A building is a constructed object intended for occupancy by humans or animals.

Building may also refer to:

== Literature ==
- Building (magazine), a British magazine
- Building (Australian magazine)

== Stage and screen ==
- Le Building, a 2005 French animated short film
- The Building (film), a 1999 Vietnamese film
- The Building (TV series), a 1993 American television series
- "Building", scene 1 from the fourth act of the opera Einstein on the Beach, composed by Philip Glass

== Music ==
=== Albums ===
- Buildings (album), an album by Northern Irish band General Fiasco
- Building (Sense Field album)

=== Songs ===
- "Building", a song by Poi Dog Pondering on their album Volo Volo
- "Buildings", a song by General Fiasco off the eponymously named album Buildings (album)

== Other uses ==
- Building (mathematics), a type of geometric structure
- Building, a classification used by the U.S. National Register of Historic Places
- In computer programming, building is the process by which source code is converted into executable object code; see compiler
- Building or Online creation, the name for creating areas and objects in online games

== See also ==
- Structure (disambiguation)
  - Structure & Nonbuilding structure
  - Architectural structure, a man-made structure used or intended for supporting or sheltering any use or continuous occupancy
- Build (disambiguation)
