= Exe =

Exe or EXE may refer to:

- .exe, a file extension
- exe., abbreviation for executive

== Places ==
- River Exe, in England
- Exe Estuary, in England
- Exe Island, in Exeter, England

== Transportation and vehicles ==
- Exe (locomotive), a British locomotive
- Rolls-Royce Exe, an aircraft engine
- Extreme E, an electric offroad rally racing series

== Other uses ==
- .EXE Magazine, a former British computer magazine
- ".exe" (Person of Interest), an episode of the TV series Person of Interest
- E.X.E., a 19th-century British artillery propellant; see Glossary of British ordnance terms
- .exe, a genre of creepypastas involving haunted video games

== See also ==
- EE (disambiguation)
- E2 (disambiguation)
- 2E (disambiguation)
- E (disambiguation)
