= Exec =

Exec or EXEC may refer to:

- Executive officer, a person responsible for running an organization
- Executive producer, provides finance and guidance for the making of a commercial entertainment product
- A family of kit helicopters produced by RotorWay International
- An abbreviation for executive

== Computing ==
- exec (system call), an operating system function for running a program
- eval, a programming language function for executing a statement or evaluating an expression, variously called exec or eval
- Exec (Amiga), the OS kernel of Amiga computers
- CMS EXEC, an interpreted command procedure control language for IBM's VM/CMS operating system
- EXEC 2, an interpreted command procedure control language for IBM's VM/CMS operating system
- UNIVAC EXEC I, the original operating system developed for the UNIVAC 1107
- UNIVAC EXEC II, an operating system developed for the UNIVAC 1107 and ported to the UNIVAC 1108
- UNIVAC EXEC 8, a.k.a. EXEC VIII, an operating system developed for the UNIVAC 1108

== See also ==
- Executable
- Executive (disambiguation)
- Non-executive director (also known as non-exec)
- Exec Shield
- Exec (errand service)
