= Built =

Built may refer to:

- Built (TV series), an American reality television series that aired on the Style Network
- Built: the hidden stories behind our structures, 2018 book by Roma Agrawal
- Building

== See also ==
- Built environment, man-made surroundings for human activity
- Built-in (disambiguation)
- Built to Last, 1989 Grateful Dead album
- Built to Spill, indie rock band
- Built-up area, urban development
- Built-up edge, in metalworking
- Built-up gun, construction technique for artillery barrels
- Indie Built, defunct computer game developer
- Stick-built, home constructed entirely or largely on-site
