= Ordinal =

An ordinal numeral is a word representing the rank of a number: "first", "second", "third", and so on.

Ordinal may also refer to:

== Mathematics and science ==
- Ordinal number, an extension of ordinal numerals used to enumerate infinite sets
- Ordinal scale, ranking things that are not necessarily numbers
- Ordinal data, a statistical data type consisting of numerical scores that exist on an arbitrary numerical scale
- Ordinal Priority Approach, a multiple-criteria decision analysis method that aids in solving the group decision-making problems
- Ordinal utility (economics): a utility function which is used only to describe the preference ordering between different outcomes.

== Religion ==
- Ordinal (liturgy), particularly in Anglicanism, Lutheranism and Catholicism, is the book containing the rites for the ordination of deacons and priests, and the consecration of bishops
  - Edwardine Ordinals, two early liturgical books of the Church of England
- Ordinal can be a book that gives the ordo (ritual and rubrics) for celebrations, see Order of Mass

== Other uses ==
- Ordinal indicator, the sign adjacent to a numeral denoting that it is an ordinal number
- Ordinal date, a simple form of expressing a date using only the year and the day number within that year
- Regnal ordinal, used to distinguish monarchs and popes with the same regnal name
