= Orders (surname) =

Orders is a surname.

== Etymology ==
The etymology of 'Orders' is unclear, although there are records extant dating the surname in its current spelling back to the 17th century in the Warminster region of Wiltshire and the 16th century in Cambridgeshire, England. The root of the name in its possible variant spelling forms can be ALD, AUD, OLD or ORD to which have been added a suffix such as AS, ES, ERS, IS, OS, US, etc. 'Orders' therefore has many possible genealogical or historical derivations which are affiliated in common via the shared modern spelling.

== Derivation ==
The modern surname is now found in many parts of the world, and suggestions as to its historical roots include:

- that it is an alternative spelling of AUDAS, which itself comes from two distinct sources, one of early medieval English origin and one of Scottish origin. The English form of the name derives from the Middle English female personal name "Aldus", itself a pet form of any of the numerous Olde English pre 7th Century male and female personal names with "(e)ald", old, as its first element. For example "Radulfus filius (son of) Alduse" is said to be noted in the 1168 Pipe Rolls of Yorkshire. The Scottish form of the surname is locational from Auldhous, in Strathclyde (Renfrewshire). The placename derives from the Olde English "eald" old, with "hus", house, hence "old house".
- it may be part of a locational name from a place called Ord in Northumberland, deriving from the Old English pre-7th Century "ord" or "orde" meaning "point". This may refer to a headland, a certain geographical 'point', a long ridge or someone dwelling at one these locales.
- it may be an Anglicized form of the Germanic personal name Ort, a short form of the various compound names, such as ORDERS, with the first element meaning "point" (for example of a sword, spear, hill, or army). 'Hare', or 'army' in old-German, is thought to have been the second element in the compound 'ord-hare' leading to 'orders'.
- in its many different spellings from Ort, Imort, and Delort, to Horta, Huerta and Hurtic, this is a surname of French, Spanish, Portuguese and German derivation. The origin is usually pre-5th century C.E. German or Visigoth, the latter tribe being the conquerors of the Spanish region in the period between the 6th and 8th centuries. As a result, many, perhaps the majority of popular Spanish and Portuguese surnames have some Germanic influence. In this case the surname is topographical and generally describes a person who lived in an 'ort', this being a settlement on the top of a hill, or in the case of the French nameholders, in a walled area, probably a defensive fortress. In some case the surname may have been descriptive for a soldier who carried an 'ort', this being a spear or lance.
- it may derive its origin from Orderic Vitalis or his father, Odelerius of Orleans, a priest who came to England with William the Conqueror.
- the Oxford University Press Names Companion lists under the surname of ORT a Southern French (Provençal or Occitan) root that stems from the Latin 'HORTUS', Latin for 'garden' or 'gardener'. This has been corrupted into the variants ORT, ORTS, ORS and ORTELLS, and thus possibly ORDERS.
- the Anglo-Saxon name stem 'Ord-' or 'Orde-' was sometimes taken to mean 'Prince' or 'Chief'.
- As a possible variant of ORDISH, from the Old English compound of Ord(a), a personal name or word suggesting a 'point', 'tip', 'extremity', 'promontory', or Ora, Old English for a topographical 'bank', and Edisc, meaning park or pastureland. This possible source of 'Orders' as a surname appears to stem from the hilly ridge near Ashover in Derbyshire known as High Oredish, reputed to be an area of rural beauty and fine views.
- it may be a Scottish locational name from various minor places named with the Gaelic "ord" meaning "hammer", which is used as a topographical term for a rounded or conical hill.

== Notable people ==
- James Orders was awarded a medal for his part in the Battle of Waterloo, 1815.
- Jonathan Orders, English-born cricketer
