= Musical structure =

Musical structure may refer to:

- Musical form
- Song structure
- Upper structure
