= Military order (instruction) =

Binding instruction given by a senior rank to a junior rank in a military context

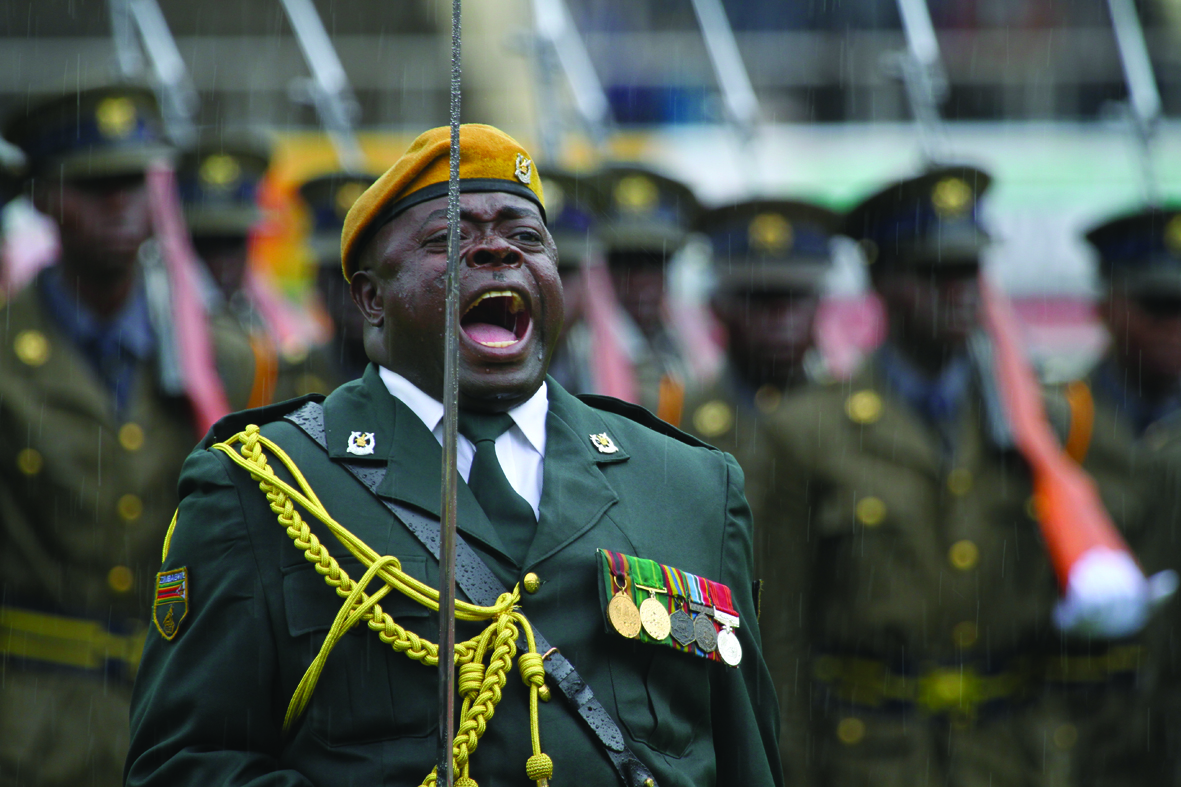
An officer of the Presidential Guard of Zimbabwe giving military commands during a parade.

A military command or order is a binding instruction given by a senior rank to a junior rank in a military context. Not all senior ranks in all military forces have the right to give an order to all lower ranks.

== U.S. Department of Defense ==
General orders, according to the United States Department of Defense Dictionary of Military and Associated Terms, are:

1. Permanent instructions, issued in order form, that apply to all members of a command, as compared with special orders, which affect only individuals or small groups. General orders are usually concerned with matters of policy or administration.
2. A series of permanent guard orders that govern the duties of a sentry on post.

An operations order, in a US DOD sense, is a plan format meant which is intended to assist subordinate units with the conduct of military operations.

== See also ==
- Superior orders
- Führerprinzip
- Nuremberg principles
