= General order =

Top level military order to all subordinates

A general order, in military and paramilitary organizations, is a published directive, originated by a commander and binding upon all personnel under their command. Its purpose is to enforce a policy or procedure that is not otherwise addressed in applicable service regulations, military law, or public law.

== See also ==
- General Orders for Sentries
