= Alice Recoque =

French computer scientist (1929–2021)

- Born: Alice Maria Arnaud; 29 August 1929; Cherchell, French Algeria
- Died: 28 January 2021 (aged 91); Ballainvilliers, France
- Education: Lycée Chaptal; ESPCI
- Occupations: Computer Scientist, Computer Engineer

Alice Recoque (née Arnaud; 29 August 1929 – 28 January 2021) was a French computer scientist, computer engineer and computer architecture specialist. She worked on the designs of mini-computers in the 1970s and led research focused on artificial intelligence.

== Early life ==
Alice Arnaud was born on 29 August 1929 in Cherchell, French Algeria. She finished École supérieure de physique et de chimie industrielles in 1954 with a title of graduate engineer, part of the 69th promotion. A classmate was Lydie Koch-Miramond.

== Career ==
Arnaud began her career at Société d'électronique et d'automatisme (SAE) in 1954. At SAE she worked on core memories. In 1956 Recoque and Françoise Becquet started designing the mini-computer CAB 500, under the direction of André Richard and François-Henri Raymond. The computer was first sold in 1960. The CAB500 was a French low cost mini-computer to perform complex, scientific calculations. She also worked on the CINA industrial computer and co-directed the CAB 1500 project, which related to ALGOL language machines.

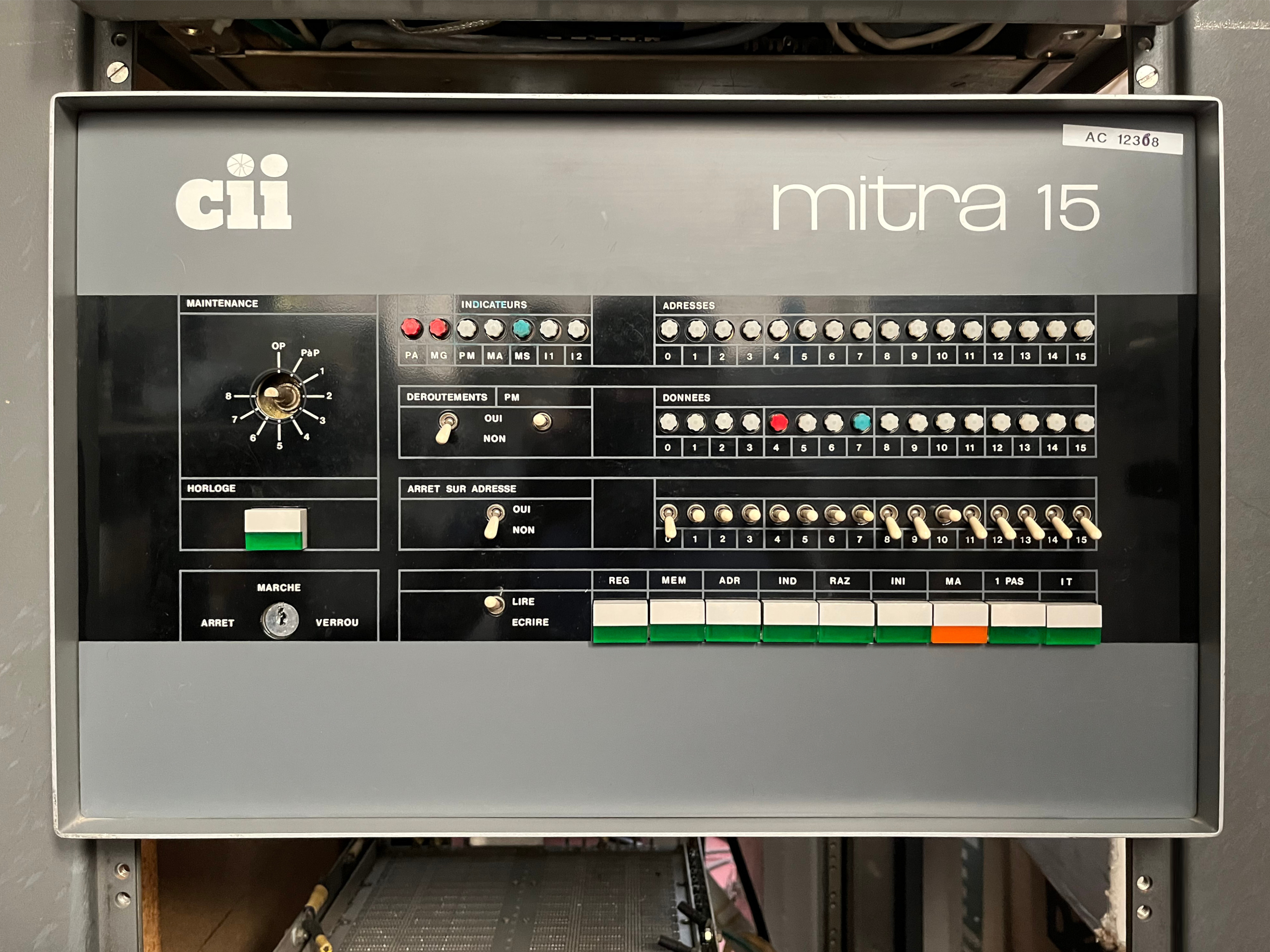
The Mitra 15 minicomputer, designed by Alice Recoque and her team

SAE was merged into Compagnie internationale pour l'informatique (CII) which was created in 1966. Arnaud worked on designing Mitra computers. The first design, Mitra 15, was launched in 1971. Both the Mitra 15 and CAB500 were commercial successes in France.

Arnaud is asked to develop a new project. The target market is that of industrial and scientific applications, aimed at completing the range of IRIS mainframe computers, which is very much oriented towards management applications. In 1978, she took part in the meeting that founded the Commission nationale de l'informatique et des libertés (CNIL). She expressed her concerns and the need to set up a safeguard against "the increased surveillance power of companies and States".

She led the Groupe Bull at CII. In 1985, the Groupe Bull focused on highly parallel machines and artificial intelligence. This project, code-named Q0, was adopted by the company's management and gave birth to the Mitra range. Recoque was appointed head of research and development for the CII's "Small Computers and Associated Systems" division and led the Mitra 15 project through to its industrialization. During that period she helped develop the language KOOL (knowledge representation object-oriented language) with its implementation in Lisp.

Following the absorption of CII by Honeywell-Bull, Recoque became responsible for relations with research and higher education. In 1982, she was appointed a member of the IT commission of the National Scientific Research Committee, which defined CNRS policy in the sector. She wrote the chapter on computer architecture in the reference publication Techniques de l'ingénieur.

In January 1985, the Groupe Bull appointed her director of artificial Intelligence. She extended the concept, hitherto confined to aspects of computer programming, to all methods and techniques aimed at studying human behaviour in order to understand and reproduce it. During this mission, carried out in close collaboration with public research bodies such as the French National Institute for Research in Computer Science and Control (Inria), Recoque, leading a strategy that mobilized more than 200 people, defined a range of products to be developed by Bull as a coherent contribution to the field of artificial intelligence. These included the development of a grammar in Prolog II intended to understand writings formulated in natural language (in French), the design of the Knowledge representation Object-Oriented Language (KOOL), developed in Lisp for Bull SPS-7 machines (derived from the CNET's SM-90) and intended for the representation of knowledge, as well as various expert systems.

In 1989, Recoque was appointed associate member of the Conseil Général des Ponts et Chaussées. In 1993 this appointment was renewed for three years. She was a speaker at The European Association for microprocessing and microprogramming in August 1975.

Recoque created and taught computer structure at ISEP for many years. She also taught computer science in other schools such as the École Centrale de Paris, Supélec and the Institut Catholique de Paris.

== Honors and awards ==
In 1979 she received the Ordre national du Mérite - Au grade de Chevalier.

In 1985 she was promoted for the Officier de l'ordre national du Mérite.

In 2016 she became an honor member of Société informatique de France.

In 2025 it was announced that an exascale supercomputer was / to be built in France by the European High-Performance Computing Joint Undertaking and it was to be named "Alice Recoque". It will be able to perform a billion billion floating point calculations per second and it will be the backbone for the network of European AI factories.

In 2026, Recoque was announced as one of 72 historical women in STEM whose names have been proposed to be added to the 72 men already celebrated on the Eiffel Tower. The plan was announced by the Mayor of Paris, Anne Hidalgo following the recommendations of a committee led by Isabelle Vauglin of Femmes et Sciences and Jean-François Martins, representing the operating company which runs the Eiffel Tower.

== Controversy ==
According to Pierre-Eric Mounier-Kuhn, a computer historian, the work of Alice Recoque has been slow to be recognised because little is said about engineers in France and because she is a woman, which would also explain the battle that had to be fought "to prevent Wikipedia from deleting the notice on Alice Recoque".
