= Lydie Koch-Miramond =

French astrophysicist (1931–2023)

- Born: Lydie Berthe Miramond; 1 June 1931; Paris, France
- Died: 5 July 2023 (aged 92); Saint-Rémy-lès-Chevreuse
- Education: ESPCI Paris
- Scientific career
- Fields: Astrophysics
- Workplaces: French Alternative Energies and Atomic Energy Commission (CEA)

Lydie Koch-Miramond (1 June 1931 – 5 July 2023) was a French astrophysicist and pioneer in the study of cosmic rays at the French Alternative Energies and Atomic Energy Commission (CEA). She played a major role in the development of French space astrophysics, especially in the discovery and study of galactic cosmic rays.

== Biography ==
Lydie Berthe Miramond was born on 1 June 1931 in Paris. In 1954, she graduated from the École supérieure de physique et de chimie industrielles de Paris (ESPCI), where she finished second in her class, the 69th cohort. Computer scientist Alice Recoque was a classmate.

She then joined the French Alternative Energies and Atomic Energy Commission's (Commissariat à l'énergie atomique et aux énergies alternatives - CEA) Physical Electronics Department, headed by Jacques Labeyrie. Whilst working there she collaborated with Italian physicist Beppo Occhialini, a specialist in cosmic rays.

In 1967, the CEA Physical Electronics Department was divided into two sections, with the establishment of a CEA Astrophysics Section in Saclay, which Koch-Miramond headed until 1979. She continued work on cosmic-ray research, focusing on the investigation of heavy-nucleus isotopes.

In addition to her scientific work, Koch-Mirmond was deeply engaged in the support of human rights, especially in regard to China. She actively participated in Amnesty International until 2009 and contributed to publications on the responsibilities of scientists in connection with human rights and world conflicts.

Lydie Koch-Miramond died on 5 July 2023 in Saint-Rémy-lès-Chevreuse at the age of 92.

== Research ==
Throughout her career, she played a key role in the development of new detector technologies. This included instruments for studying cosmic rays, gamma rays, X-ray astronomy, Ge(Li) detectors for hard X-rays and Si(Li) detectors for soft X-rays, detection of electron-positron annihilation lines and CCD detectors.

Koch-Miramond played a key role in several stratospheric flight programmes. The first led to the discovery of the first galactic electrons in 1963; another flight confirmed the observations in 1965. A further trans-Mediterranean flight led to the first measurement of positrons in galactic cosmic radiation in 1967.

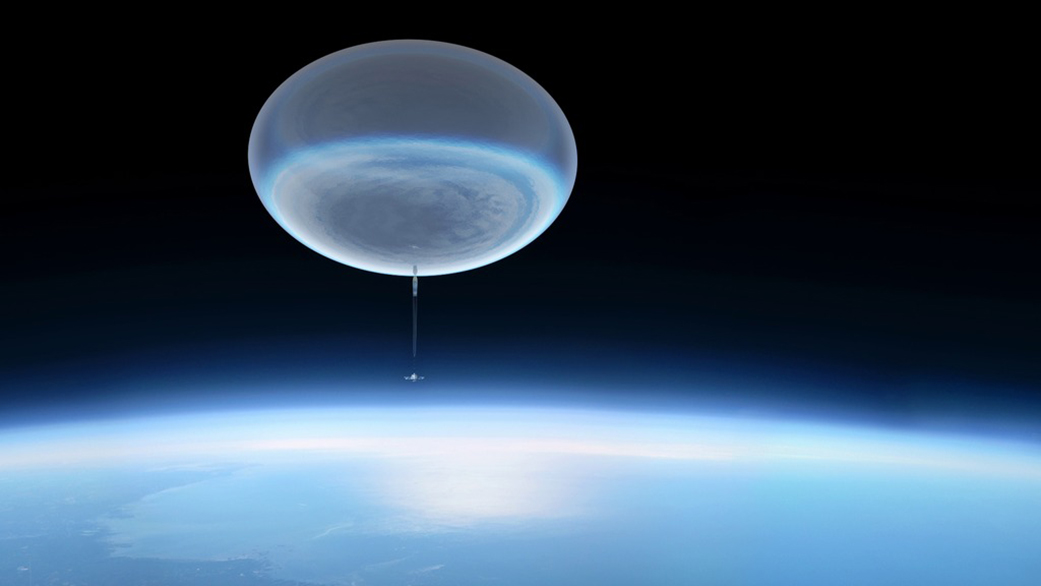
High altitude balloon

In 1975, under Koch-Miramond's leadership, two ISOFER balloon flights were carried out to measure the composition of cosmic radiation. In September 1975, one balloon travelled 2,000 km at an altitude of 40 km from Sioux Falls, South Dakota to New Jersey. These were precursors to the instruments installed on NASA's HEAO-3-C satellite, which launched in 1979. The instrument made it possible to study heavy nuclei in cosmic radiation using the geomagnetic field. Koch-Miramond later explained this in a video on the CEA website. Koch-Miramond coordinated the development of the instrument with Bernard Peters of the Danish Space Institute, leading to the provision of the cosmic-ray nucleus spectrum which remained a benchmark for over 30 years.

== Advocacy ==
She became a scientific advisor to the CEA's Directorate of Material Sciences and head of the Ethics in Science working group within Euroscience. She chaired the Human Rights and Ethics Committee of the Société Française de Physique, following its creation in 1990.

Committed to human rights, Koch-Miramond contributed to the book La Chine et les droits de l'homme (China and Human Rights) following a symposium on contemporary China organised by Amnesty International in 1990. In 2002, she signed an appeal in the newspaper Le Monde alongside 2,500 prominent figures ‘for a just and immediate peace in the Middle East’.

== Awards and recognition ==
- Chevalière of the Ordre des Palmes académiques
- Chevalière of the Ordre national du Mérite (17 June 1980)
- Chevalière of the Légion d'honneur (31 December 1991)
- 1989: Prix du CEA, shared with Jean-Jacques Engelmann and Philippe Goret, for research on the composition of cosmic rays and space detection techniques

In 2026, Koch-Miramond was announced as one of 72 historical women in STEM whose names have been proposed to be added to the 72 men already celebrated on the Eiffel Tower. The plan was announced by the Mayor of Paris, Anne Hidalgo following the recommendations of a committee led by Isabelle Vauglin of Femmes et Sciences and Jean-François Martins, representing the operating company which runs the Eiffel Tower.

== Selected publications ==
- with Jean-Pierre Cabestan, Françoise Aubin & Yves Chevrier (1991). La Chine et les droits de l'homme. L'Harmattan & Amnesty International. ISBN 978-2-7384-0771-9.
- with Gérard Toulouse (2003). Les scientifiques et les droits de l'homme. Maison des sciences de l'homme. p. 293. ISBN 978-2-7351-0995-1.
- with Daniel Iagolnitzer, Vincent Rivasseau (2006). La science et la guerre : la responsabilité des scientifiques. Questions contemporaines. L'Harmattan. p. 265. ISBN 978-2-296-01402-2.
- Agrinier, Bernard; Koch-Miramond, Lydie; Paul, Jacques (2006). "La Collaboration Milano-Saclay-Palermo". The Scientific Legacy of Beppo Occhialini. pp. 141–149. doi:10.1007/978-3-540-37354-4_11. ISBN 978-3-540-37353-7.
- Comment peut-on être chercheur(e) ?. Paris: l'Harmattan. 2007. p. 105. ISBN 978-2-296-02512-7.
