= Programmation Automatique des Formules =

Programmation Automatique des Formules is a programming language designed in 1957-1959 by Dimitri Starynkevitch at SEA, a small French computer company. PAF was similar to FORTRAN. It ran on a drum computer, the CAB 500. The title is French for Automatic Programming of Formulae.
