= Minicomputer =

Mid-1960s–late-1980s class of smaller computers

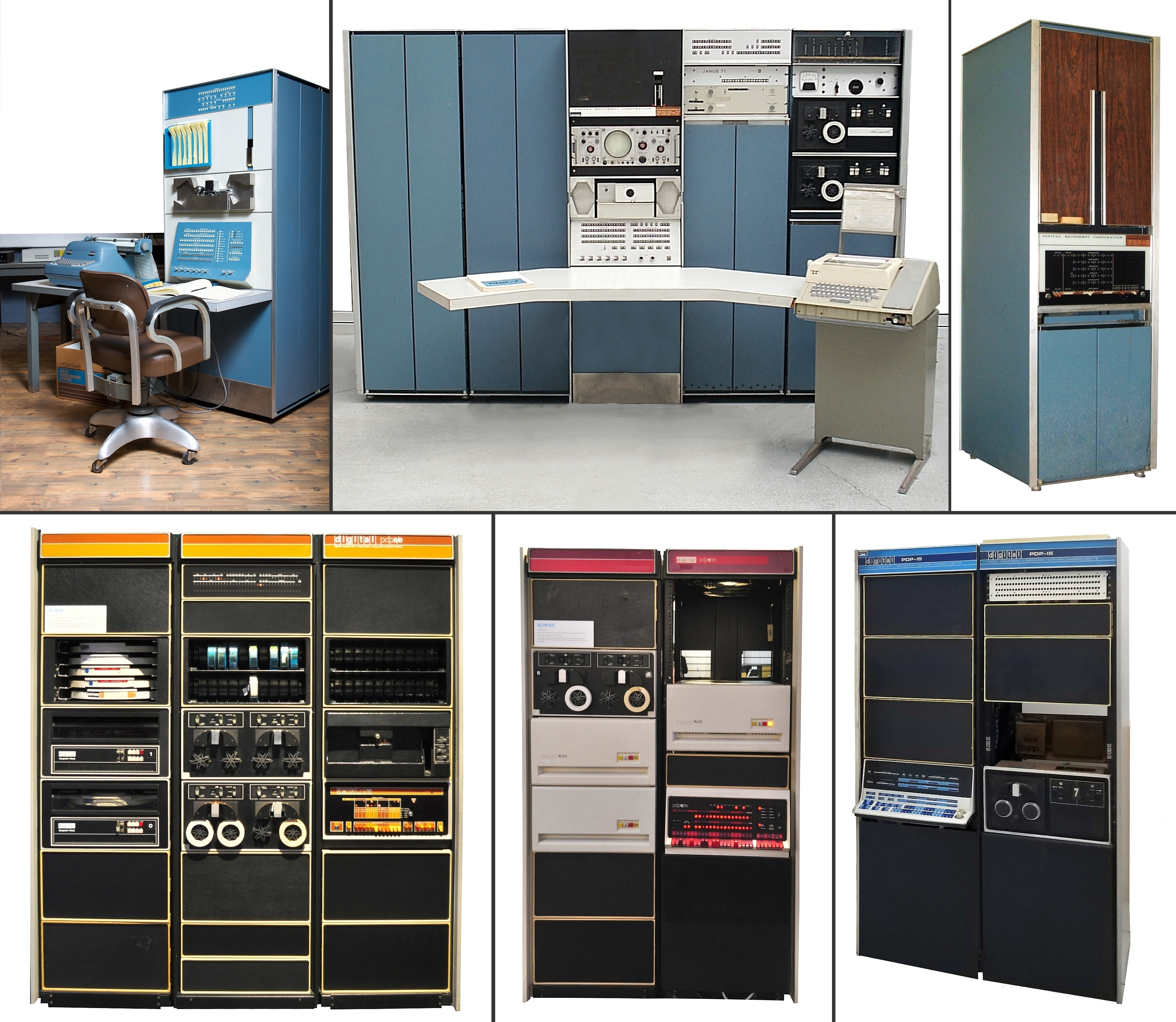
Six different minicomputers (out of many more models) produced by the Digital Equipment Corporation (DEC) with the year of introduction in brackets: First row: PDP-1 (1959), PDP-7 (1964), PDP-8 (1965); second row: PDP-8/E (1970), PDP-11/70 (1975), PDP-15 (1970).

A minicomputer is a type of general-purpose computer mostly developed from the mid-1960s, built significantly smaller and sold at a much lower price than mainframe computers. Minicomputers are small relative to earlier and bigger machines.

The class formed a distinct group with its own software architectures and operating systems. Minis were designed for control, instrumentation, human interaction, and communication switching, as distinct from calculation and record keeping. Many were sold indirectly to original equipment manufacturers (OEMs) for final end-use application. During the two-decade lifetime of the minicomputer class (1965–1985), almost 100 minicomputer vendor companies formed. Only a half-dozen remained by the mid-1980s.

When single-chip MOSFET CPU microprocessors appeared in the 1970s, the definition of "minicomputer" subtly shifted: the word came to mean a machine in the middle range of the computing spectrum, between mainframe computers and microcomputers. The easily-misunderstood term "minicomputer" is less often applied to later like systems; a near-synonymous (IBM-adjacent) expert term for this class of system is "midrange computer".

== History ==
=== Definition ===
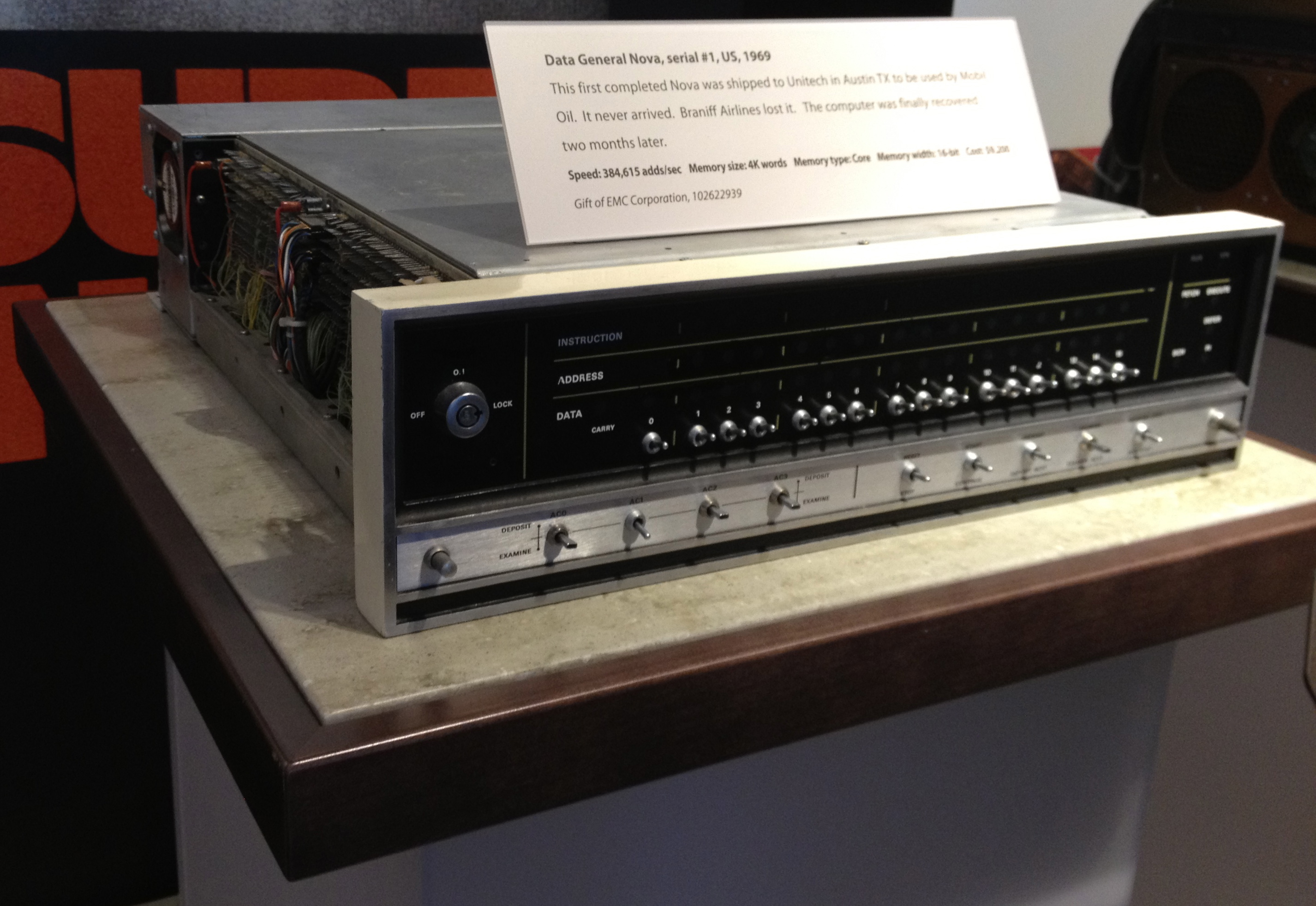
Data General Nova, serial number 1, on display at the Computer History Museum

The term "minicomputer" developed in the 1960s to describe the smaller computers that became possible with the use of transistors and core memory technologies, minimal instruction sets and less expensive peripherals such as the ubiquitous Teletype Model 33 ASR. They usually took up one or a few 19-inch rack cabinets, compared with the large mainframes that could fill a room. Later minicomputers tended to be more compact, and while still distinct in terms of architecture and function, some models eventually shrank to a similar size as large microcomputers.

In terms of relative computing power compared to contemporary mainframes, small systems that were similar to minicomputers had been available from the 1950s. In particular, there was an entire class of compact vacuum tube-based drum machines, such as the UNIVAC 1101 (1950), and the Bendix G-15 and LGP-30 (both 1956), all of which shared some features of the minicomputer class. Similar models using magnetic delay-line memory followed in the early 1960s. These machines, however, were essentially designed as small mainframes, using a custom chassis and often supporting only peripherals from the same company. In contrast, the machines that became known as minicomputers were often designed to fit into a standard chassis and deliberately designed to use common devices such as the ASR 33.

Another common difference was that most small machines before the 1970s were not "general purpose", in that they were designed for a specific role such as engineering, process control or accounting. On these machines, programming was generally carried out in their custom machine language, or even hard-coded into a plugboard, although some used a form of BASIC. DEC wrote, regarding their PDP-5, that it was "the world’s first commercially produced minicomputer". It meets most definitions of "mini" in terms of power and size, but was designed and built to be used as an instrumentation system in labs, not as a general-purpose computer. Many similar examples of small special-purpose machines exist from the early 1960s, including the UK Ferranti Argus and Soviet UM-1NKh.

The CDC 160, circa 1960, is sometimes pointed to as an early example of a minicomputer, as it was small, transistorized and (relatively) inexpensive. However, its basic price of $100,000 (equivalent to $1,088,301 in 2025) and custom desk-like chassis places it within the "small system" or "midrange computer" category as opposed to the more modern use of the term minicomputer. Nevertheless, the CDC 160 remains a strong contender for the term "first minicomputer", provided the earlier drum machines, e.g. SEA CAB 500, are excluded as non-transistorized.

=== 1960s and 1970s success ===
Most computing histories point to the 1964 introduction of Digital Equipment Corporation's (DEC) 12-bit PDP-8 as the first minicomputer. Some of this is no doubt due to DEC's widespread use of the term starting in the mid-1960s. Smaller systems, including those from DEC such as the PDP-5 and LINC, had existed prior to this point, but it was the PDP-8 combination of small size, general purpose orientation and low price that puts it firmly within the modern definition. Its introductory price of $18,500 (equivalent to $189,005 in 2025) places it in an entirely different market segment than earlier examples such as the CDC 160.

In contemporary terms, the PDP-8 was a runaway success, ultimately selling 50,000 examples. (Note: For comparison, the CDC 160 sold about 50 units.) Follow-on versions using small scale integrated circuits further lowered the cost and size of the system. Its success led to widespread imitation, and the creation of an entire industry of minicomputer companies along Massachusetts Route 128, including Data General, Wang Laboratories and Prime Computer. Other popular minis from the era were the HP 2100, Honeywell 316 and TI-990.

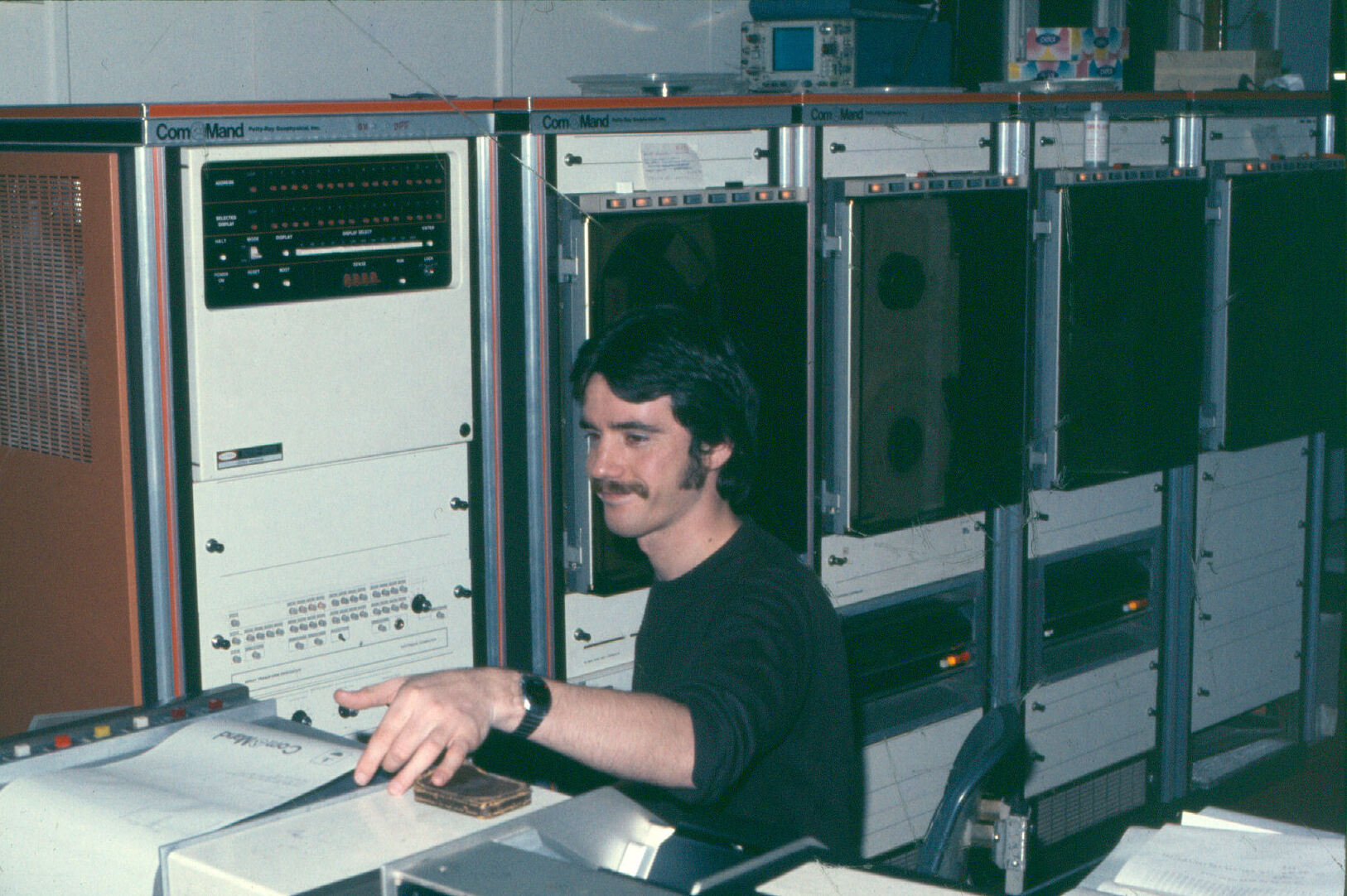
Raytheon RDS 500 seismic processing system in Benghazi in 1978

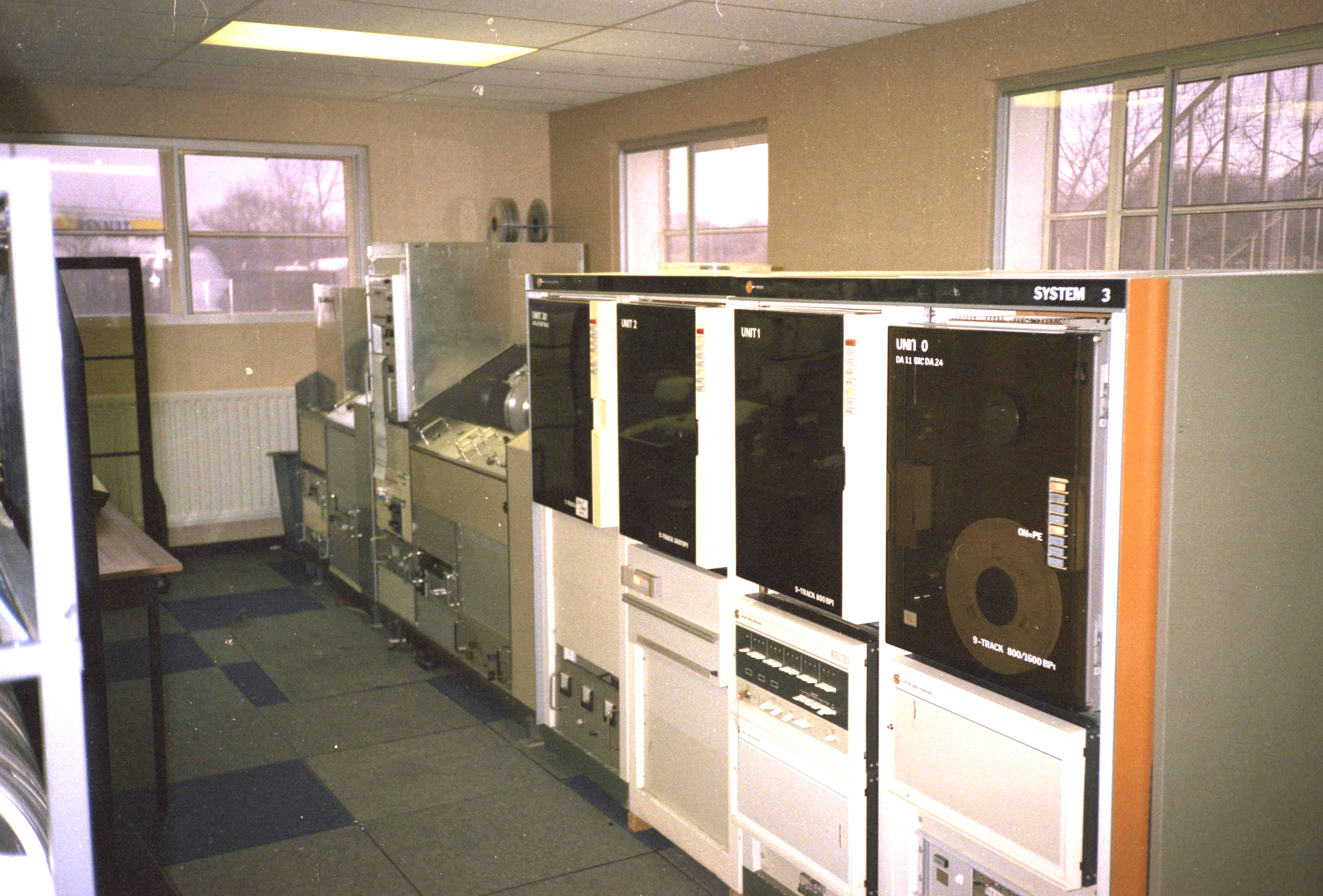
Varian Data Machines system connected to analogue tape playback system in 1984

Early minis had a variety of word sizes, with DEC's 12 and 18-bit systems being typical examples. The introduction and standardization of the 7-bit ASCII character set led to the move to 16-bit systems, with the late-1969 Data General Nova being a notable entry in this space. By the early 1970s, most minis were 16-bit, including DEC's PDP-11. For a time, "minicomputer" was almost synonymous with "16-bit", as the larger mainframe machines almost always used 32-bit or larger word sizes. In a 1970 survey, The New York Times suggested a consensus definition of a minicomputer as a machine costing less than US$25,000 (equivalent to $207,000 in 2025), with an input-output device such as a teleprinter and at least four thousand words of memory, that is capable of running programs in a higher level language, such as Fortran or BASIC. The typical customer was a department in a large company, at which the finance department's mainframe was too busy to serve others.

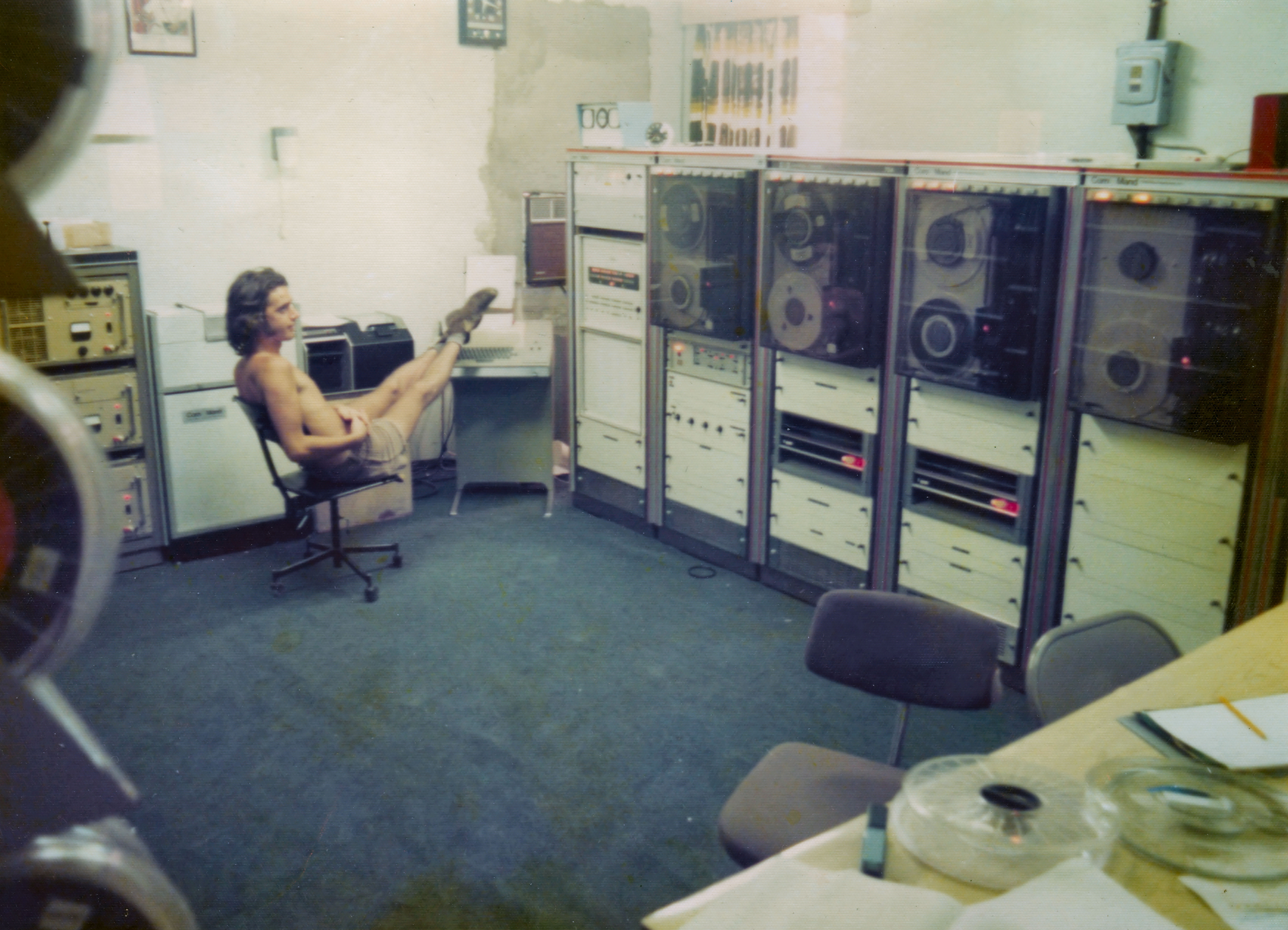
Raytheon RDS 704 onsite seismic processing system in Mogadishu in 1974

As integrated circuit design improved, especially with the introduction of the 7400-series integrated circuits, minicomputers became smaller, easier to manufacture, and as a result, less expensive. They were used in manufacturing process control, telephone switching and to control laboratory equipment. In the 1970s, they were the hardware that was used to launch the computer-aided design (CAD) industry and other similar industries where a small dedicated system was needed.

The boom in worldwide seismic exploration for oil and gas in the early 1970s saw the widespread use of minicomputers in dedicated processing centres close to the data collection crews. Raytheon Data Systems RDS 704 and later RDS 500 were predominantly the systems of choice for nearly all the geophysical exploration as well as oil companies.

At the launch of the MITS Altair 8800 in 1975, Radio Electronics magazine referred to the system as a "minicomputer", although the term microcomputer soon became usual for personal computers based on single-chip microprocessors. At the time, microcomputers were 8-bit single-user, relatively simple machines running simple program-launcher operating systems such as CP/M or MS-DOS, while minis were much more powerful systems that ran full multi-user, multitasking operating systems, such as VMS and Unix.

The Tandem Computers NonStop product line shipped its first fully fault-tolerant cluster computer in 1976.

Around the same time, minis began to move upward in size. Although several 24 and 32-bit minis had entered the market earlier, it was DEC's 1977 VAX, which they referred to as a superminicomputer, or supermini, that caused the mini market to move en-masse to 32-bit architectures. This provided ample headroom even as single-chip 16-bit microprocessors such as the TMS 9900 and Zilog Z8000 appeared in the later 1970s. Most mini vendors introduced their own single-chip processors based on their own architecture and used these mostly in low-cost offerings while concentrating on their 32-bit systems. Examples include the Intersil 6100 single-chip PDP-8, DEC T-11 PDP-11, microNOVA and Fairchild 9440 Nova, and TMS9900 TI-990.

=== Mid-1980s and 1990s decline ===
Minicomputer companies historically competed on the price and speed of their computers, instead of marketing and advertising. By the early 1980s, the 16-bit minicomputer market had all but disappeared as newer 32-bit microprocessors began to improve in performance. Those customers who required more performance than these offered had generally already moved to 32-bit systems by this time. But it was not long before this market also began to come under threat; the Motorola 68000 offered a significant percentage of the performance of a typical mini in a desktop platform. True 32-bit processors such as the National Semiconductor NS32016, Motorola 68020 and Intel 80386 soon followed. By the mid-1980s, high-end microcomputers offered CPU performance equal to low-end and mid-range minis, and the new RISC approach promised performance levels well beyond the fastest minis, and even high-end mainframes.

All that really separated micros from the mini market was storage and memory capacity. Both of these began to be addressed through the later 1980s; 1 MB of RAM became typical by around 1987, desktop hard drives rapidly pushed past the 100 MB range by 1990, and the introduction of inexpensive and easily deployable local area network (LAN) systems provided solutions for those looking for multi-user systems. The introduction of workstations opened new markets for graphics-based systems that the terminal-oriented minis could not even address. Minis remained a force for those using existing software products or those who required high-performance multitasking, but the introduction of newer operating systems based on Unix began to yield highly practical replacements for these roles as well. For computational science, clusters of commodity PCs largely replaced minicomputers.

Mini vendors began to rapidly disappear through this period. Data General responded to the changing market by focusing entirely on the high-performance file server market, embracing a role within large LANs that appeared resilient. This did not last; Novell NetWare rapidly pushed such solutions into niche roles, and later versions of Microsoft Windows did the same to Novell. DEC decided to move into the large-computer space instead, introducing the VAX 9000 mainframe in 1989, but it was a flop in the market and disappeared after almost no sales. The company then attempted to enter the workstation and server markets with the DEC Alpha, but was too late to save the company, and they eventually sold their remains to Compaq in 1998. By the end of the decade all of the classic vendors were gone; Data General, Prime, Computervision, Honeywell, and Wang, failed, merged, or were bought out.

Today, only a few proprietary minicomputer architectures survive. The IBM System/38 operating system, which introduced many advanced concepts, lives on with IBM's AS/400. Great efforts were made by IBM to enable programs originally written for the IBM System/34 and System/36 to be moved to the AS/400. After being rebranded multiple times, the AS/400 platform was replaced by IBM Power Systems running IBM i. In contrast, competing proprietary computing architectures from the early 1980s, such as DEC's VAX, Wang VS, and Hewlett-Packard's HP 3000 have long been discontinued without a compatible upgrade path. OpenVMS was ported to HP Alpha and Intel IA-64 (Itanium) CPU architectures, and now runs on x86-64 processors.

Tandem Computers, which specialized in reliable large-scale computing, was acquired by Compaq in 1997, and in 2001 the combined entity merged with Hewlett-Packard. The NonStop Kernel-based NonStop product line was re-ported from MIPS processors to Itanium-based processors branded as 'HP Integrity NonStop Servers'. As in the earlier migration from stack machines to MIPS microprocessors, all customer software was carried forward without source changes. The NSK operating system, now termed NonStop OS, continues as the base software environment for the NonStop Servers, and has been extended to include support for Java and integration with popular development tools such as Visual Studio and Eclipse. Later, Hewlett-Packard would split into HP and Hewlett-Packard Enterprise. The NonStop products and the DEC products would then be sold by HPE.

=== Industrial impact and heritage ===
Database software is an example of an area where a variety of companies emerged that built turnkey systems around minicomputers with specialized software and, in many cases, custom peripherals that addressed specialized problems such as computer-aided design, computer-aided manufacturing, process control, manufacturing resource planning, and so on. Many if not most minicomputers were sold through these original equipment manufacturers and value-added resellers.

Several pioneering computer companies first built minicomputers, such as DEC, Data General, and Hewlett-Packard (HP) (who later referred to its HP 3000 minicomputers as "servers" rather than "minicomputers"). And although today's PCs and servers are clearly microcomputers physically, architecturally their CPUs and operating systems have developed largely by integrating features from minicomputers.

In the software context, the relatively simple OSs for early microcomputers were usually inspired by minicomputer OSs (such as CP/M's similarity to Digital's single user OS/8 and RT-11 and multi-user RSTS time-sharing system). Also, the multiuser OSs of today are often either inspired by, or directly descended from, minicomputer OSs. Unix was originally a minicomputer OS, while the Windows NT kernel, the foundation for all current versions of Microsoft Windows, borrowed design ideas liberally from VMS. Many of the first generation of PC programmers were educated on minicomputer systems.

== Examples ==
- AT&T 3B series computers
- Basic/Four
- Bendix G-15, a vacuum tube computer sometimes considered an early mini
- CII Mitra 15
- Control Data's CDC 160A and CDC 1700
- CTL Modular One, from the UK
- DEC PDP and VAX series
- Data General Nova and Eclipse series
- GEC 4000 series
- Hewlett-Packard HP 3000 series and HP 2100 series
- Honeywell-Bull DPS 6/DPS 6000 series
- K-202, first Polish minicomputer
- IBM midrange computers
- Olivetti L1 series
- Interdata 7/32 and 8/32
- Norsk Data Nord-1, Nord-10, and Nord-100
- Prime Computer products, including the 200, 300, 400, and 50 series
- Pyramid Technology products
- Raytheon RDS 704 and RDS 500
- Ridge Computers Ridge 32 and Ridge 3200 series
- Tandem Computers NonStop product line, focusing on fault tolerance
- Texas Instruments TI-990
- Wang VS series

== See also ==
- The Soul of a New Machine – about the development of Data General's Eclipse/MV minicomputers in the early 1980s
- Charles Babbage Institute
- History of computing hardware (1960s–present)
- Superminicomputer
- Maxicomputer

== Bibliography ==
- Weitzman, Cay (1974). Minicomputer Systems: Structure, Implementation and Application. Englewood Cliffs, New Jersey: Prentice Hall. ISBN 9780135842270. OCLC 3255458.
