= Société d'électronique et d'automatisme =

Early French computer manufacturer from 1947

Société d'Electronique et d'Automatisme
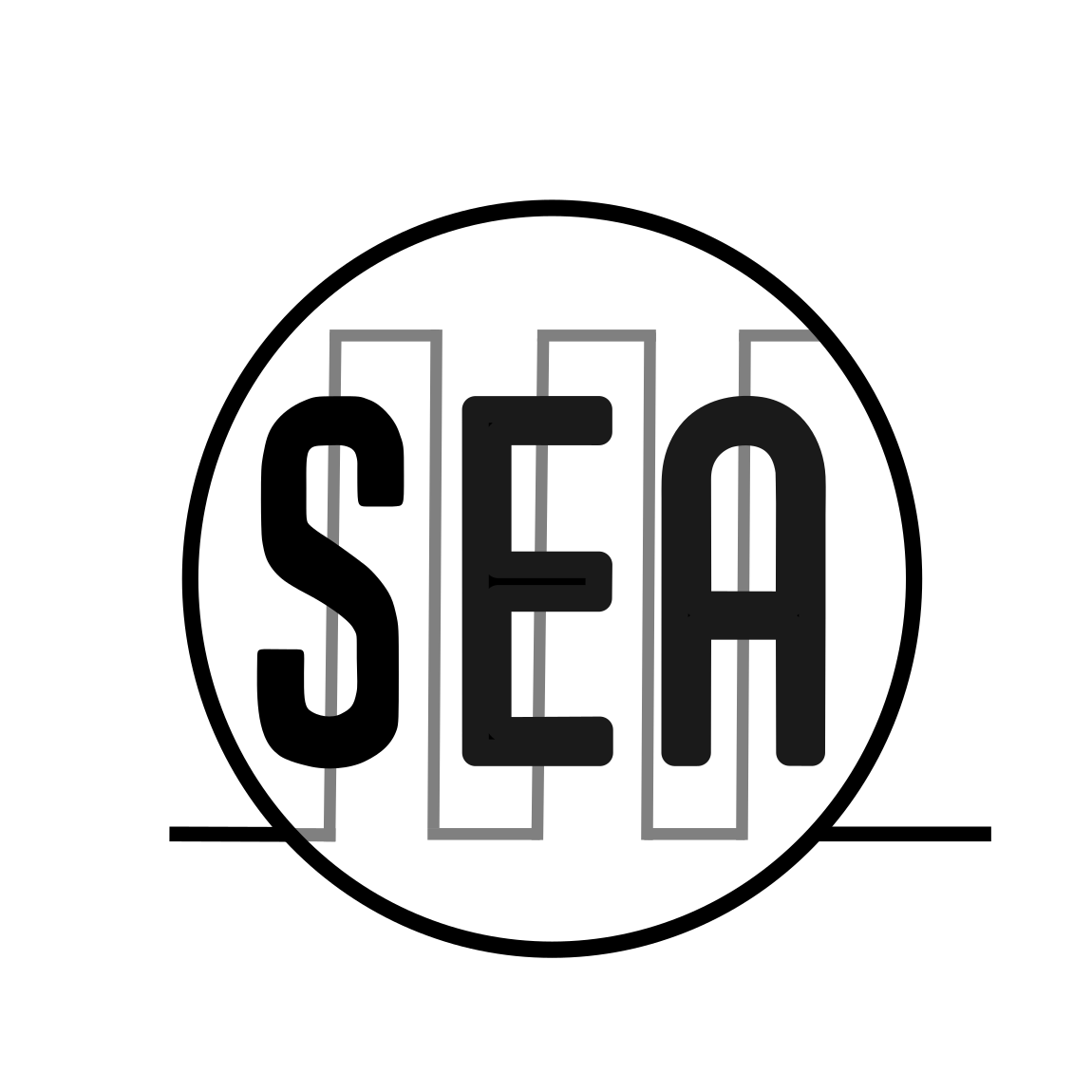
- Industry: Computer manufacturing
- Founded: 1947
- Founder: François-Henri Raymond
- Defunct: 1966
- Fate: Merged into CII
- Headquarters: Courbevoie, France
- Products: Analog computers, digital stored-program computer
- Number of employees: Up to 800

The Société d'électronique et d'automatisme (SEA) was an early French computer manufacturer established in 1947 by electrical engineer François-Henri Raymond, which designed and put into operation a significant portion of the first computers in France during the 1950s.

The SEA played a major role in driving the development of the French computer industry, training the first generation of engineers and installing about 170 computers between 1955 and its dissolution in 1966, when it merged with CII.

== History and achievements ==
In 1947, François-Henri Raymond was sent for a technical trip to the United States where he met with Howard H. Aiken at Harvard University, visited the MIT laboratories and came across John von Neumann's report on the EDVAC and the pioneering concepts of a then futuristic machine: the stored-program computer. Upon returning to Paris, he shared his ideas to produce such machines with his employer, a TV and radar manufacturer, but failed to convince him. François-Henri Raymond resigned and, without a formal business plan, established the Society of Electronics and Automation in December 1947, in a former automobile factory bombed during World War II. The startup's initial capital was contributed by a machine-tool maker, some of his friends, and Raymond's former employer. The SEA first client was the Air Force's missile bureau, whose operations demanded significant computational resources.

=== 1949: analog computers ===
SEA's inaugural computer, the OME 11, appeared in February 1949. This analog computer would set the stage for a series of subsequent models, including the OME 12, 15, 40, and 416 (OME was short for "Opérateur Mathématique Électronique"). While many were tailored for military applications, some models achieved a relative commercial success in the civilian sector. Notably, the OME L2 and P2 (1952), featuring vacuum tubes, and the transistor-based OME R (1959) stood out and were subsequently followed by a new generation of analog computers with the NADAC 20 (1961) and NADAC 100 (1962).

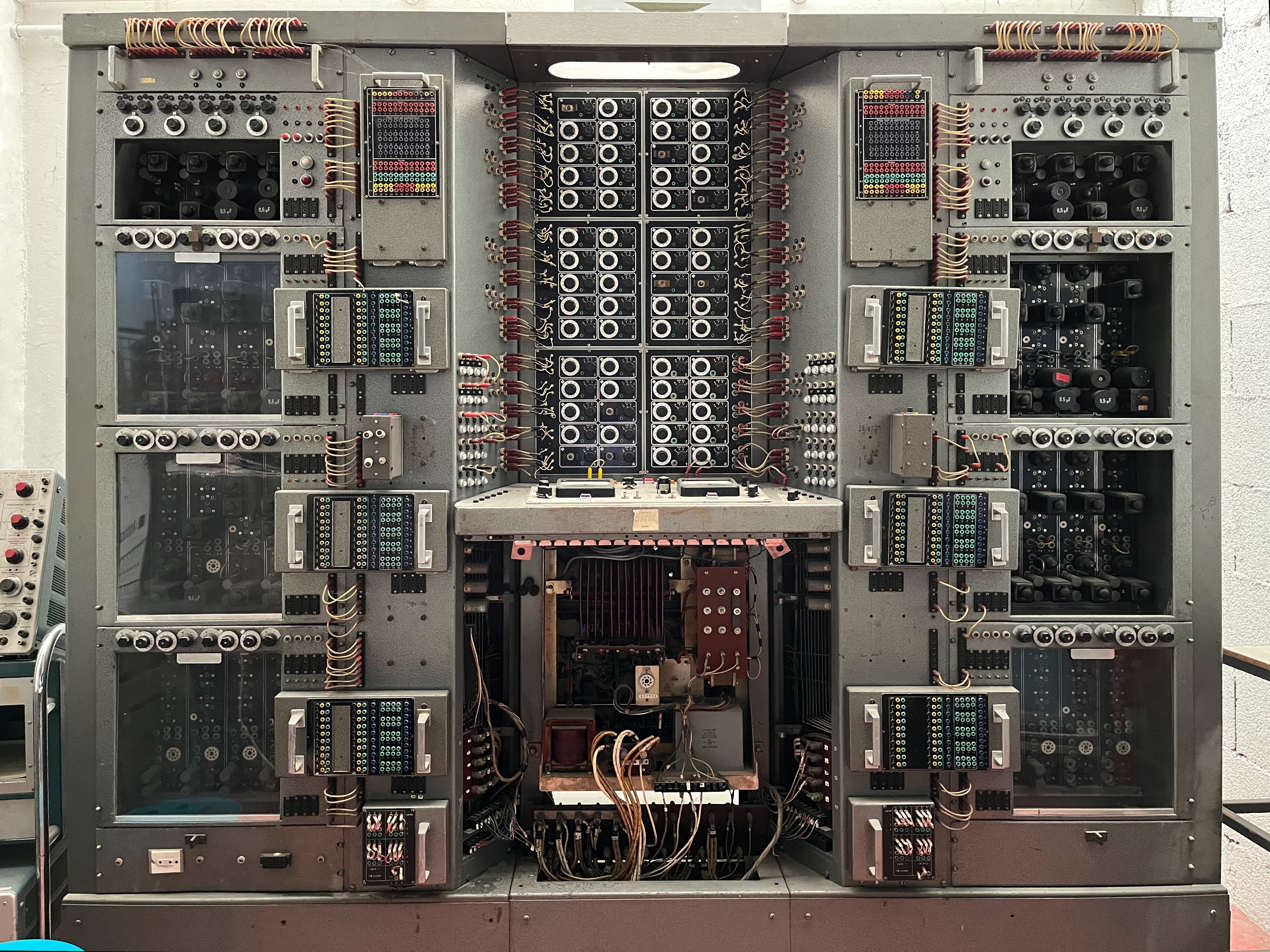
An OME P2 (OME 40 variant) analog computer, 1952

SEA's analog computers enjoyed commercial success, with nearly 200 units sold and a strong international presence. They found diverse applications in fields such as physical, nuclear and hydrodynamic simulation - these machines were notably employed for flight simulations of the future Concorde aircraft. SEA also designed tailor-made analog computers for specific military applications.

=== 1951: CUBA ===
After securing a contract with DEFA (now known as DGA), SEA embarked on the development of its first stored-program computer in 1951, and France's first as well: the Calculatrice Universelle Binaire de l'Armement (CUBA). This contract provided SEA the opportunity to bring to life the digital computer plans it had been sketching since 1949, mainly based on John von Neumann's reports and the Cambridge EDSAC.

The then ambitious technological choices made for CUBA lead to numerous delays. Notably, the decision to utilize cutting-edge magnetic core memories instead of the more established Williams tubes or mercury delay lines proved risky, as no manufacturer in the still World War 2 recovering French industry was yet capable of producing them. This challenge of sourcing components adhering to a novel set of requirements extended to many aspects, even reaching into wiring - SEA, as stated by its founder, was the first French company to employ ribbon cables and wire wrap.

Among other technological choices, SEA aimed to minimize the use of unreliable vacuum tubes, favoring instead germanium diodes for most of its logic and restricting tube usage to signal regeneration, a design first experimented with the SEAC (see diode logic). Additionally, an auxiliary drum memory was selected to complement the system, which SEA ultimately procured from the British company Ferranti due to the lack of a French manufacturer ready in time.

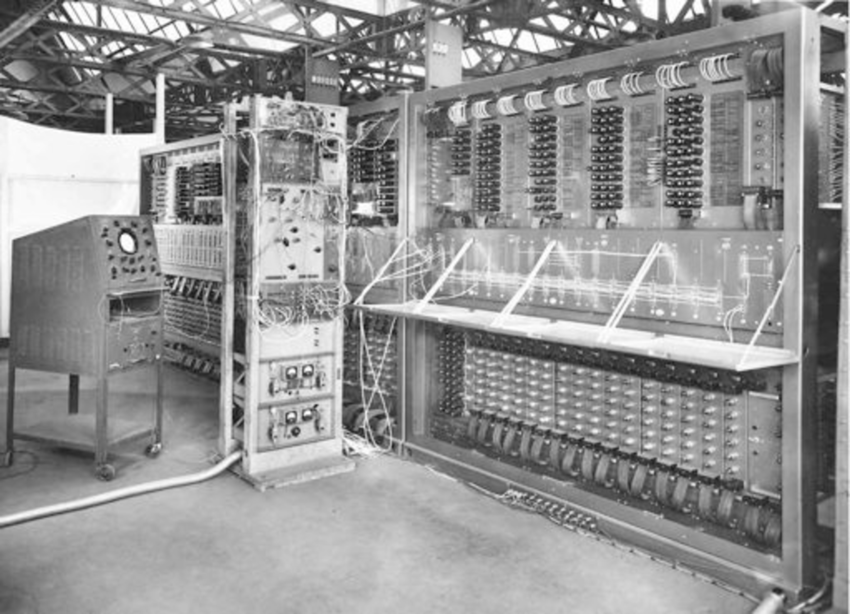
Partial view of the CUBA digital stored-program computer (1951)

CUBA was eventually delivered in 1954 and put into operation in 1956. With a three-years delay it became soon obsolete and was abandoned shortly thereafter. By that time, the French computer industry had already witnessed the emergence of other creations: SEA's own CAB 1011, a general computer which was used for cryptanalysis at SDECE (now DGSE), its CAB series 2000 and 3000 computers, and notably the Gamma 3 from Compagnie des machines Bull, introduced in 1952 and sold in quantities of around 1200 units. CAB stood for Calculatrice Automatique Binaire (Binary Automatic Calculator - the term "ordinateur", French for "computer", was coined only in 1955).

The mid-1950s then marked a turning point for SEA, as the company went on to develop two transistorized computers, constituting its two large-scale productions in this field.

=== 1956: CAB 500 ===
Starting from 1956, SEA took an interest in the emerging potential of transistors, although their maturity at that time was yet to be proven. Among the alternatives, SEA explored magnetic logic, which was slower but notably reliable, making it suitable for a more compact-sized computer. In the same year, SEA invented the Symmag, a logic gate utilizing ferrite beads similar to those used in magnetic core memory.

The Symmag would prove to be a central element in the architecture of the CAB 500, alongside a drum memory and sixteen 32-bit registers implemented on magnetic-core memory. The CAB 500 was a compact desktop computer designed to be operated by a single unskilled person, with minimal technical requirements for installation and operation. Furthermore, it was powered by one of the first interactive high-level languages, PAF, which facilitated its usage.

The CAB 500 experienced immediate success, prompting the scaling up of production methods. Approximately a hundred units of the CAB 500 were manufactured and sold, with around a dozen units exported to countries including China and Japan.

=== 1958: CAB 3900 ===
Starting from 1958, SEA became a subsidiary of Schneider-Westinghouse, affording it increased industrial resources. This was also the juncture at which the decision was made to create a business computer, leveraging the experience gained from the CAB 2124 and 3030. Although primarily designed for scientific purposes, these machines were also used for business tasks, revealing a gap in the manufacturer's offerings.

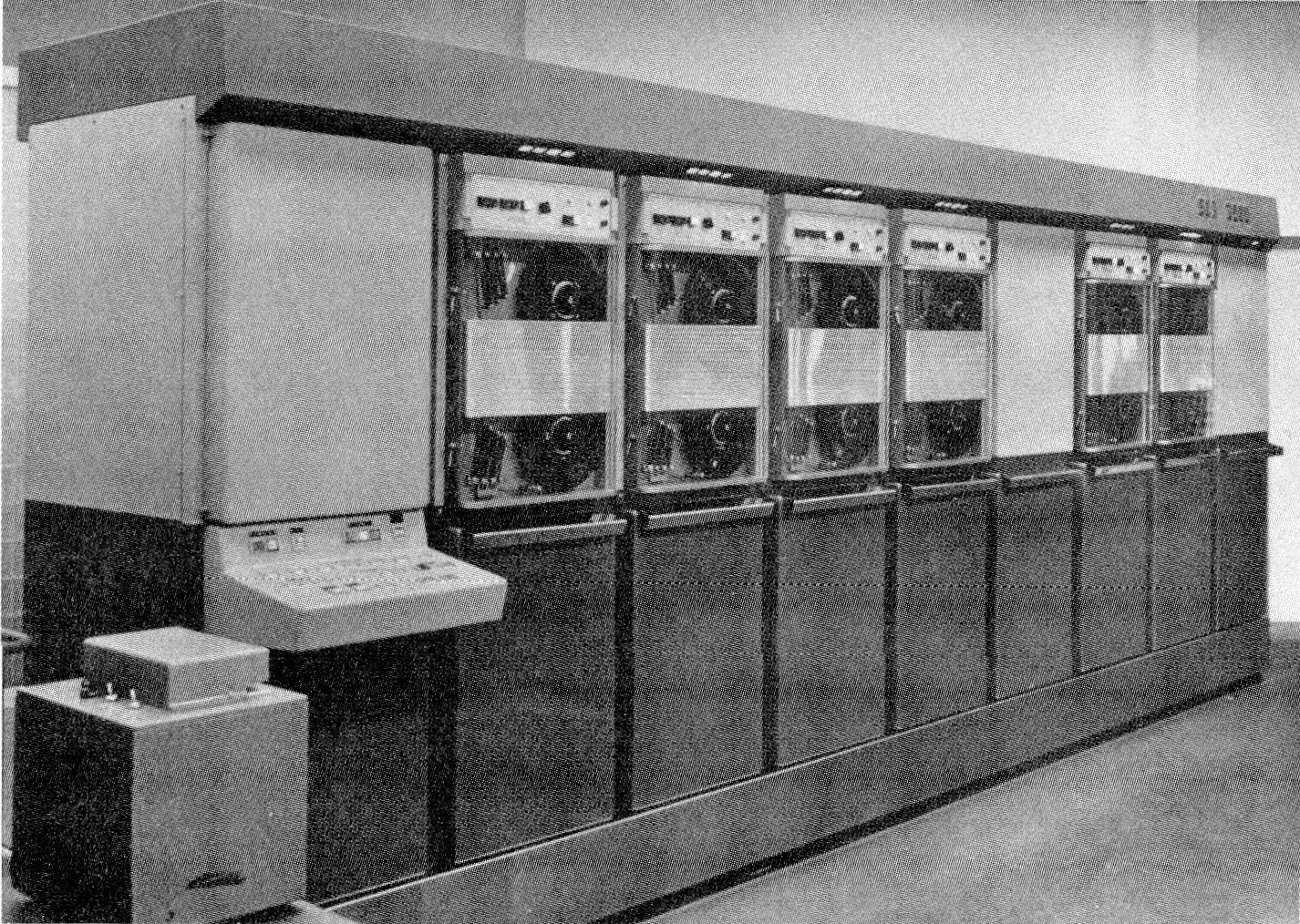
Overview of a CAB 3900

In collaboration with Crédit Lyonnais, the prototype named CABAN (Banking Calculator) was developed, placing emphasis on magnetic tape storage, offering higher capacity compared to punched cards. Intending to compete with the IBM 1401 and the Bull Gamma 30, the CAB 3900 was a fully transistorized machine, featuring a magnetic-core main memory and accommodating up to nine tape drives. It operated at a fairly fast 2 MHz (in contrast, the IBM 1401 was clocked at 870 kHz), which enabled SEA to devise a bit-serial processor, which was less complex and costly while maintaining adequate performance for business applications. The Symmag logic, however, was abandoned as it was deemed too slow.

A programming language called PAGE (Programmation Automatique de GEstion - Automatic Business Programming) was developed for the CAB 3900. It had analogies with COBOL but more limited ambitions and greater simplicity.

In 1963, the French government urged SEA to align with Bull, leading to a negotiated agreement: SEA would allow Bull to market its computer range in exchange for Bull's Andelys plant. This agreement had mixed effects for SEA. On one hand, Bull's sales representatives were not accustomed to catering to scientific needs, resulting in underwhelming sales for the CAB 500. On the other hand, they had to incorporate the competing CAB 3900 business computer into their portfolio alongside their own offerings.

Nonetheless, these newfound production resources enabled SEA to expand its industrial capacity and manufacture the CAB 3900. An improved version, the CAB 4000, was introduced shortly thereafter, rectifying identified flaws from the first generation and enhancing its capabilities.

A total of 37 CAB 3900 and 4000 units were sold, marking the second-largest commercial success for SEA.

=== Later developments ===
In 1964, SEA entered into a Memorandum of Understanding with Control Data Corporation (CDC), granting access to the technologies and peripherals of the emerging American supercomputer specialist. However, this agreement did not progress further, as CDC subsequently established its own commercial subsidiary in France. In the same year, IBM unveiled the 360 series, introducing a novel concept of both horizontal (application domains) and vertical (performance levels) compatibility within a unified family of computers. This groundbreaking concept of compatibility and interoperability greatly interested SEA, prompting an exploration of a new generation of products built on these principles. SEA drafted an architecture inspired by stack machines for its processor and Algol for its machine language, similar to Burroughs' approach in the United States. Initially, two models were planned: a successor to the entry-level CAB 500 (CAB 1500) and a high-performance machine for the top tier (CAB 15000). With ambitious plans in mind, SEA contemplated an industrialization program to manufacture approximately a thousand of these new machines.

Ultimately, compelled by the French government in December 1966 as part of Plan Calcul, SEA was forced to merge with Compagnie européenne d'automatisme électronique, a joint subsidiary of Compagnie générale d'électricité, Compagnie générale de télégraphie sans fil (CSF), and Intertechnique, forming the Compagnie internationale pour l'informatique (CII).

At its peak, SEA employed up to 800 staff members and secured nearly 1000 patents.

== Marketed models ==
The SEA primarily produced computers in small quantities, about a couple hundreds, and occasionally as one-of-a-kind units, most notably for military clients. Six major categories of computers stand out:

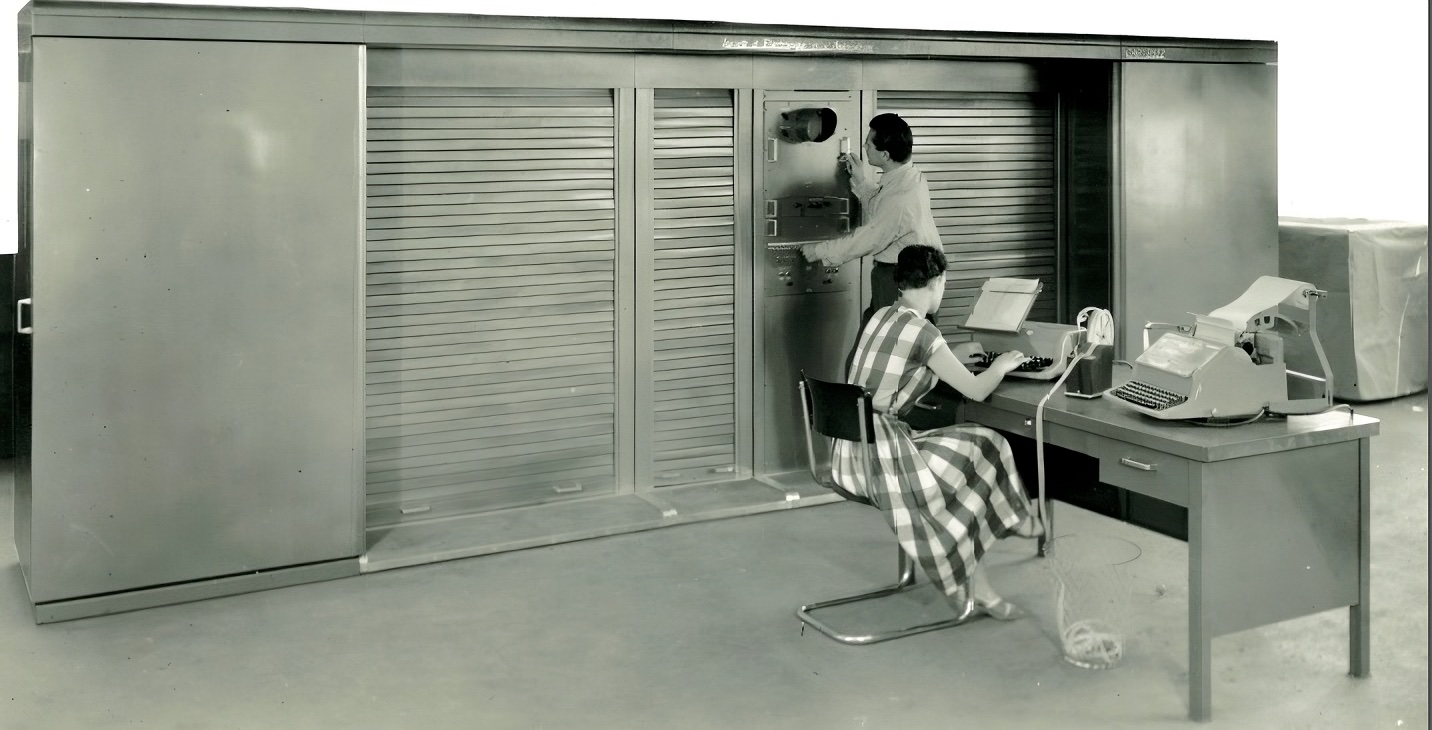
The CAB 2022 computer installed at MATRA, 1955

- Analog computers, from the OME and NADAC family
- Unique military models, such as the CUBA and CAB 1011
- The CAB 2000 and 3000 families, which were the first mass produced stored program computers from SEA
- Business computers (CAB 3900 and 4000)
- The CAB 500, a relatively different small computer in the range
- And finally, research prototypes: the Dorothées, CAB 1500 and 15000

The following table provides an overview of the key digital computers constructed by SEA. The analog calculators from the OME and NADAC series are not included in the representation, neither are specific, non commercial units such as the CUBA.

Model	Design year	First commissioning year	Units built	Fonction and description
CAB 1011	Early 1950s	1955	1	General digital computer used by the French intelligence services for cryptanalysis.
CAB 2000	1952	1955	4	22-bit serial processor, drum memory (8192 words) with two magnetic-core memories used as instructions and data caches. Shared some similarities with the designs of the EDSAC and SEAC. It utilized diode logic, comprising approximately 8000 diodes and 800 vacuum tubes, similar to the CUBA and CAB 1011, and could also perform hardware-based multiplications and divisions.: Two CAB 2022 units were supplied to Matra and the Directorate of Studies for Arms Manufacturing (DEFA, now DGA), then another to the LRBA military agency under the name SABA (Simulateur Arithmétique Binaire de l'Armement). The unit at Matra remained in service until 1964 and clocked 33,000 operating hours.; A last one, the CAB 2124, was installed at l'Oreal in 1957 for business use. It was fitted with magnetic tapes but was later destroyed after a fire broke out.; The CAB 2200 was intended to introduce architectural extensions but was soon abandoned in favor of the newer CAB 3000 architecture.
CAB 3000	1955	1957	4	Spin-off of the CAB 2000 design for a business and scientific line, using 32-bit serial logic with a parallel binary multiplier.: Two CAB 3018 were used for flight simulation computer for MATRA and Nord-Aviation, with real-time capabilities and an analog to digital converter for sampling sensors.; The CAB 3030 was produced for Comptoir des Produits Sidérurgiques and the CAB 3026 for INSEE.; A CAB 3040 allowing concurrent calculations and floating-point arithmetic was planned but later abandoned for a newer design.
Dorothée	1956		2	Transistorized computer prototypes.
CAB 500	1956	1961	>100	Scientific desktop computer with magnetic logic, rival to the IBM 1620. SEA's biggest commercial success.
CAB 3900	1958		26	Transistorized business computer with magnetic tape storage, competing with Bull Gamma 30 (RCA 301) and IBM 1401.
CAB 4000			11	Enhanced version of the CAB 3900, with 26 units sold, marking the 3900/4000 series as SEA's second biggest commercial success.
CAB 1500	1966		Cancelled	Planned successor to the CAB 500, design halted by CII after the merger of SEA into it.

== See also ==
- List of vacuum tube computers
- History of computing
