= CAB 500 =

Computer made in France circa 1960

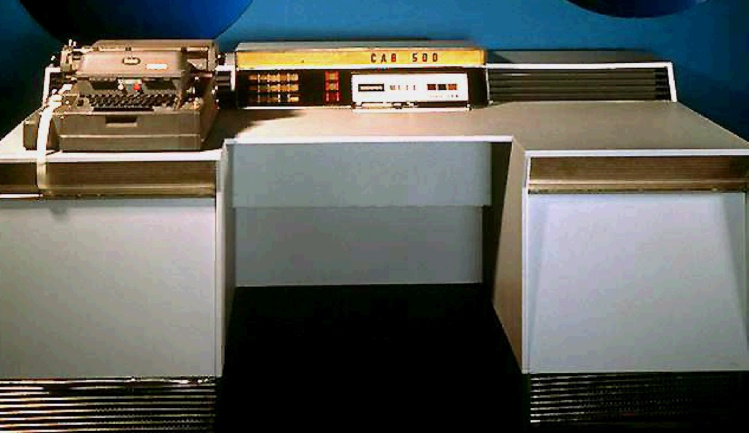
- Manufacturer: Société d'Electronique et d'Automatisme
- Product family: Small scientific computer
- Generation: Second generation computer
- Released: 1960
- Discontinued: 1964
- CPU: Built with ~360 proprietary SYMMAG 200 magnetic logic modules (solid state, transistorized)
- Memory: 16 registers of 32-bit words, 16 kilowords drum memory (64 kB)
- Display: Typewriter
- Input: Typewriter
- Power: 1500W
- Dimensions: 2 m x 90 cm x 85 cm
- Weight: 650 kg

The CAB 500 (Calculatrice Automatique Binaire 500, or Binary Automatic Calculator 500) was a transistorized computer using drum memory designed between 1957-1959 by Société d'Electronique et d'Automatisme (SEA) and manufactured in about a hundred units, with the first one delivered in 1961. It was predominantly distributed in Europe, with a few units also being sold in China and Japan. In Japan, it had a distinct market presence through the Yaskawa Electrics Corporation, which held a licensing agreement with SEA.

The CAB 500 featured a novel micro-programmed architecture which used transistors and magnetic amplifiers for its logic called symmags, developed by SEA. It also ran an interactive high-level language for real-time calculations, one of the first of its kind, and an incremental compiler for a programming language known as PAF, which bore resemblance to Fortran and BASIC. Alice Recoque played a role in its development (with Dimitri Starynkevitch).

== Specifications ==
Designed for scientific and statistical computing applications, this computer has a design reminiscent of a regular desk, somewhat similar to the IBM 1620 with which it competed. Its dimensions were 2m x 0.90m x 0.85m. A remarkable aspect of this machine for its time is that it did not require any special setup such as air conditioning, and could be connected to a standard 220-volt three-phase power supply. This straightforward installation was complemented by its relatively low cost, made possible by its technology built around SYMMAG 200 magnetic logic elements and mass production. Its power consumption was 1,500 watts.

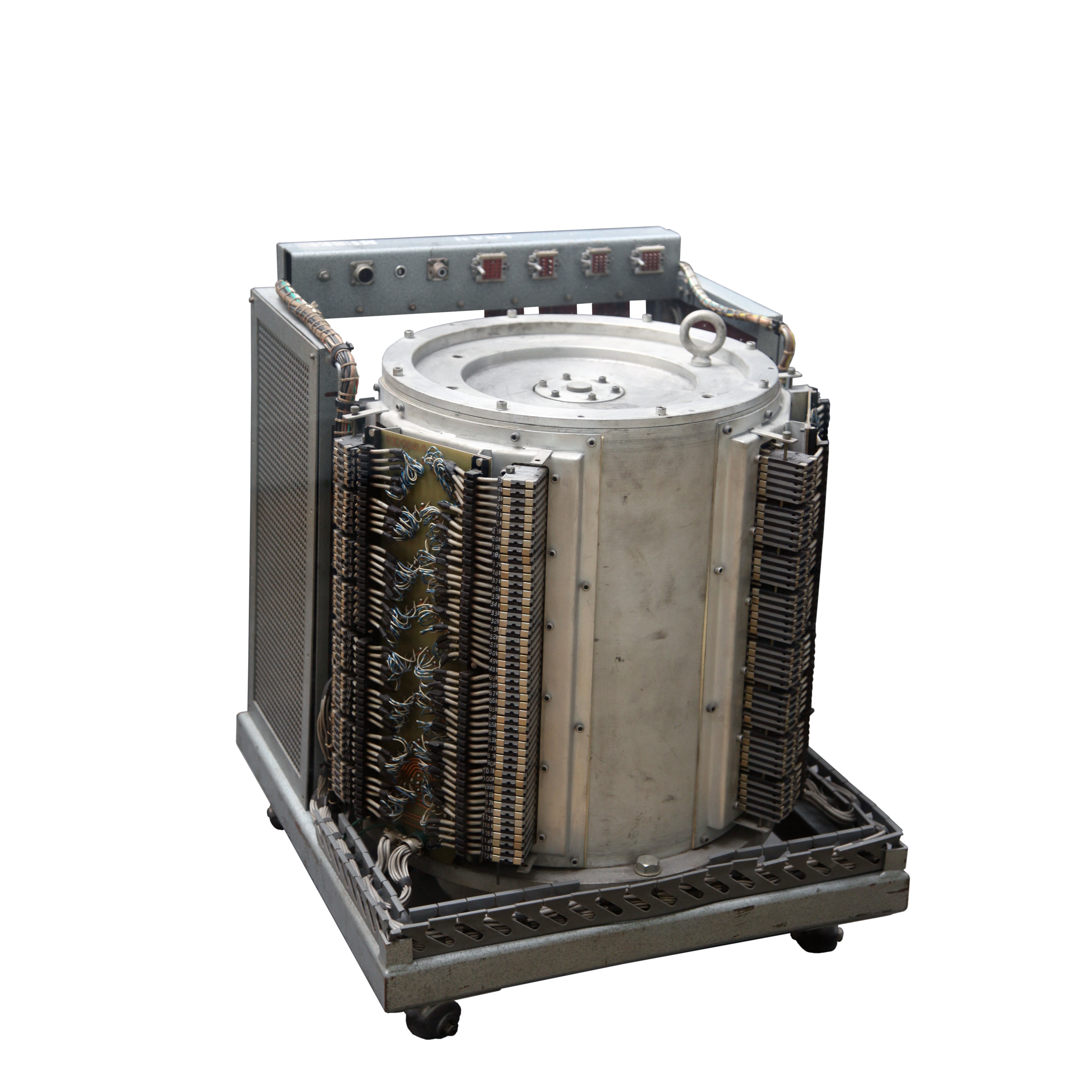
CAB 500 drum memory

The CAB 500 was intentionally designed to be accessible even to those without specific technical training in computing. One of its distinctive features was its interactive mode, enabling users to work directly from its built-in keyboard, akin to a teletype typewriter. Functions commonly used in this mode were represented by letters, like 'A' for addition or 'M' for multiplication. Additionally, the machine possessed the capability to leverage microprogram for handling more complex operations. In programmed mode, it also incorporated an innovative formula automatic programming language called 'Programmation Automatique des Formules' (PAF), which translated functions into machine code.

The CAB 500 was equipped with a magnetic drum capable of storing over 16K 32-bit words, representing about 16,000 ten-digit numbers, which enabled the execution of complex calculations, detailed statistical analyses, or extensive administrative management tasks. It also supported automatic address modification, sequence breaks, and conditional execution of instructions. Finally, it featured 16 immediate-access registers to enhance operational speed.

One of the more unconventional feature of the CAB 500 was its partial use of magnetic logic using symmags, small magnetic coils akin to those found in core memory, which formed logic gates.

In terms of applications, the CAB 500 could solve linear systems with over 60 unknowns, invert matrices of order more than 60, and handle operations research problems with a substantial number of variables.

== Performance ==
The following table summarizes the main performance characteristics of the CAB 500.

Opération	Type	Time per operation
Addition - Subtraction (in hardware)	Fixed point	32 μs
Addition - Subtraction (in hardware)	Floating point (with microcode)	40 ms
Multiplication (in software)	Fixed or floating point	60 ms
Division (in software)	Fixed or floating point	80 ms
Square root (in software)	Floating point (with microcode)	80 ms
Sine (in software)	Floating point (with microcode)	200 ms

== PAF programming language ==
PAF (Programmation Automatique de Formules - Automatic Formula Programming) was developed by Dimitri Starynkévitch at SEA, France, between 1957 and 1959. It bore some resemblance to Fortran and the later-introduced BASIC. PAF brought some novelties such as an automatic keyword completion system with single-letter variables, and a line by line program compilation allowing interactivity.

The following program computes a quadratic equation:

PAF

D=B2-4AC
X=(-B+VD)/2A
Y=(-B-VD)/2A

10 POSER A=1
20 POSER B=2
30 POSER C=3
40 CALCULER D
50 SI D<0 ALLER EN 100
60 SI D=0 ALLER EN 120
70 CALCULER X,Y
80 IMPRIMER AVEC 3 DEC RC 'LES RACINES SONT :' X Y
90 ALLER EN 140
100 IMPRIMER 'IL N'Y A PAS DE SOLUTION'
110 ALLER EN 140
120 CALCULER X
130 IMPRIMER AVEC 3 DEC RC 'LA RACINE DOUBLE EST :' X
140 FIN ALLER EN 10

== Notable uses ==
D. Starynkevitch, the father of the PAF language, programmed a poem generator on the CAB 500, drawing inspiration from the work of Raymond Queneau: 'Cent mille milliards de poèmes' (One Hundred Thousand Billion Poems).

== See also ==
- IBM 1620, desk scientific computer from IBM released in 1959
- CDC 160, desk scientific computer from Control Data Corporation released in 1960
