= Department of Informatics, University of Oslo =

Department of Informatics
- Institutt for informatikk
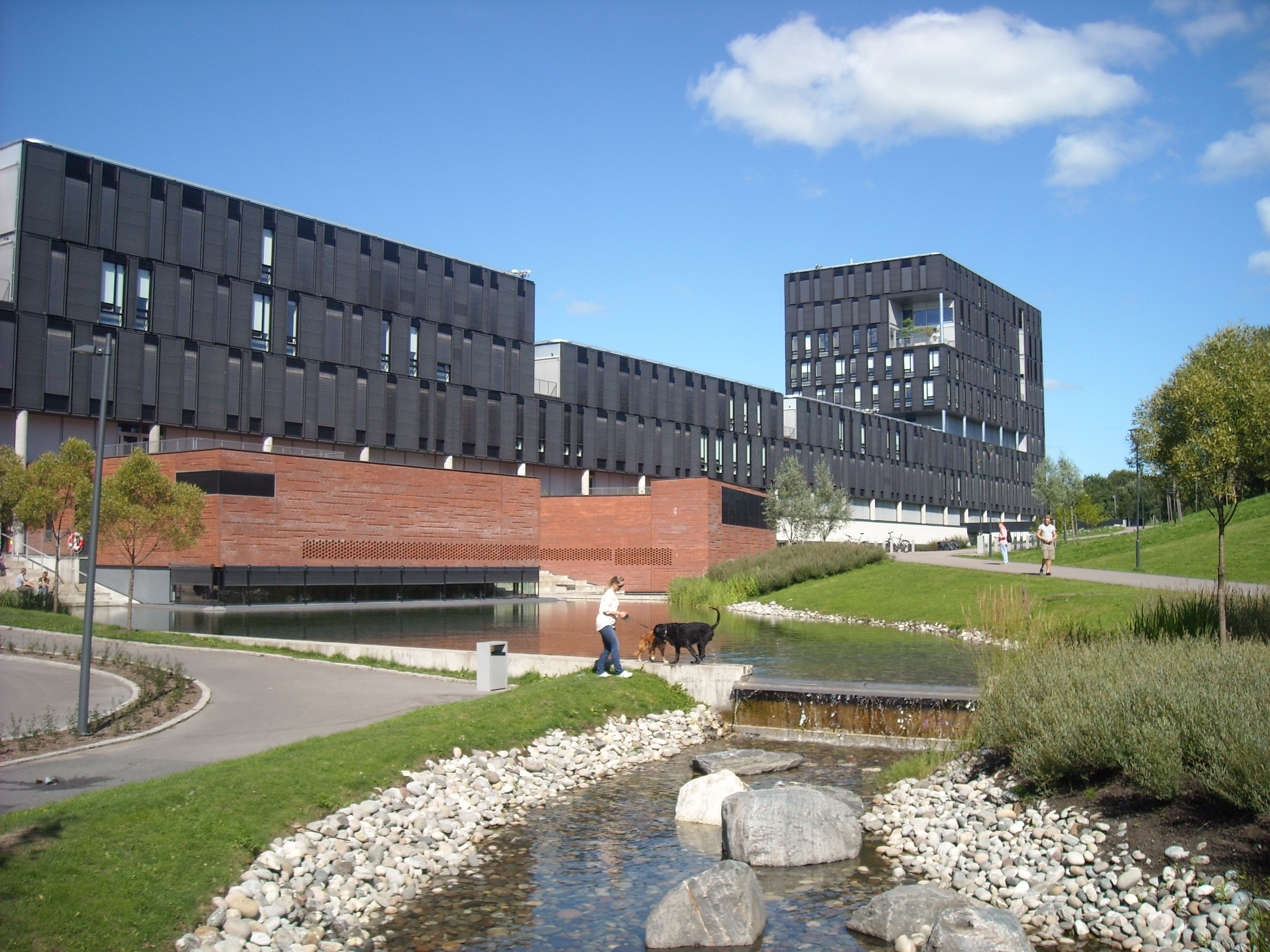
- The new informatics building, Ole-Johan Dahl's house.
- Abbreviation: IFI
- Formation: 1977; 49 years ago
- Type: Institute
- Coordinates: 59°56′36.3″N 10°43′03.5″E
- Parent organization: University of Oslo
- Website: https://www.mn.uio.no/ifi/english/index.html

The Department of Informatics (Norwegian: Institutt for informatikk) at the University of Oslo is the oldest and largest department for informatics in Norway. The department was in 2017 ranked number 1 in Norway, 3rd in Europe, and 12th in the world in Computer Science and Engineering by Academic Ranking of World Universities.

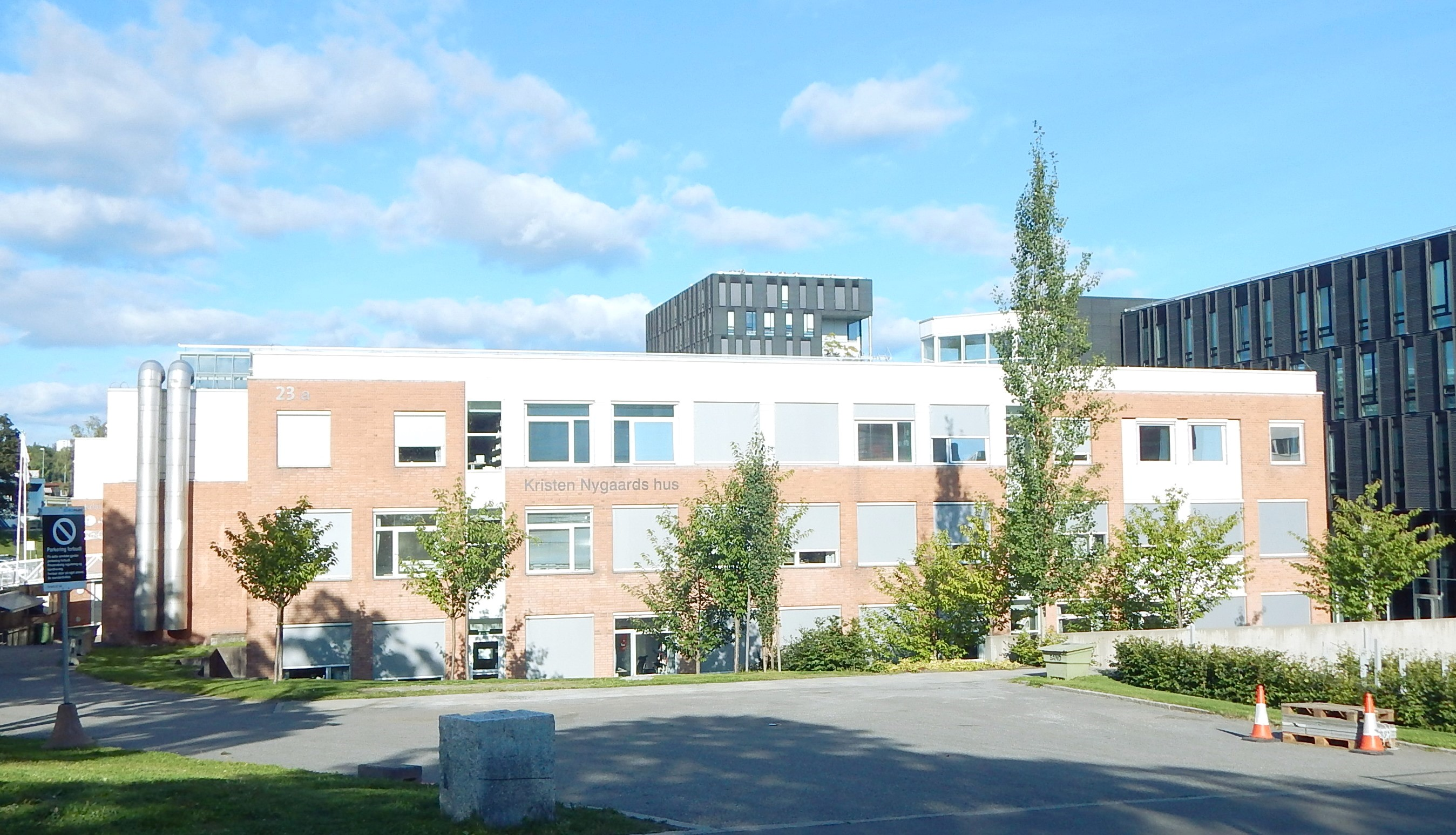
Old informatics building Kristen Nygaard's house is located next door to Ole-Johan Dahl's house and shared with Norwegian Computing Center.

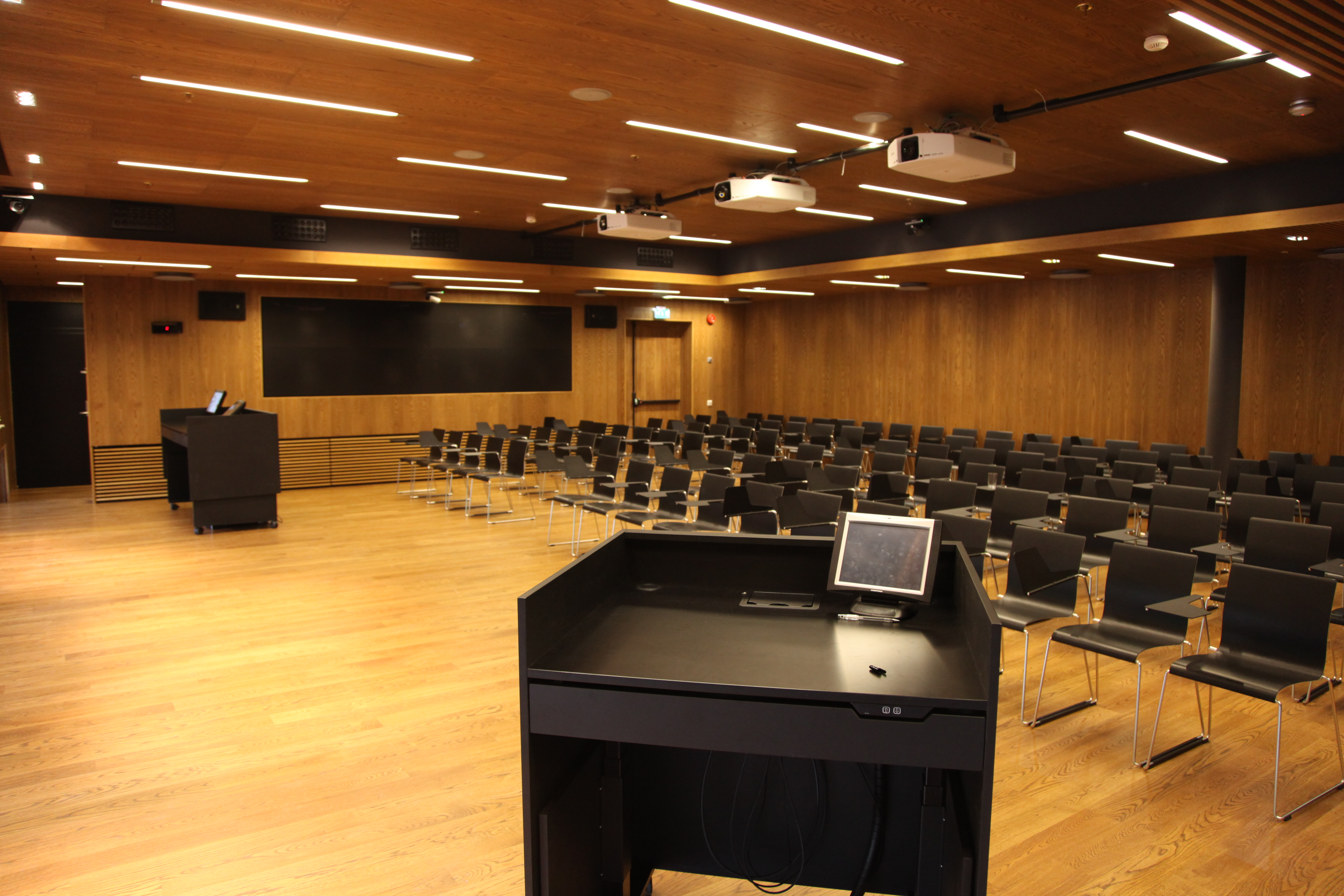
All auditoriums are named after programming languages. The Smalltalk auditorium is seen here in Ole-Johan Dahls House.

Famous researchers that have been associated with the department includes Turing Award winners such as Kristen Nygaard, Ole-Johan Dahl and Donald Knuth.

== History ==
The department was created in 1977, as a merger of Department of Numerical Mathematics at the Department of Mathematics and the Department of Cybernetics at the Department of Physics.

However, the history of computer science at the university goes further back than that. In 1958, the university had received its large machine "FREDERIC", and Harald Keilhau held a programming course for those who needed the machine for their research. Ernst S. Selmer also gave a lecture on data processing from the mid-fifties, and from the sixties the first competence-giving courses in programming (based on ALGOL and machine coding) were given by John Midtdal.

In 1968, Ole-Johan Dahl was appointed professor at the Department of Mathematics. At the beginning of the seventies, Dahl developed a course package in computer processing intended for lower grades, and wrote textbooks in syntax and semantics in programming languages and in algorithms and data structures. One of Dahl's most influential publications at that time was Structured Programming, which was published in 1972 and co-authored with Edsger W. Dijkstra and Tony Hoare.

In 1972, Rolf Nordhagen became head of the Computing Center at the university. At that time, Nordhagen started international collaborative projects that made important contributions to the foundation of networks and services. His leading role in UNINETT and NORDUnet was an apparent preamble for the Internet of today. Nordhagen was in 2014 posthumously honored with an admission into the Internet Hall of Fame.

From 1972 to 1973, Donald Knuth spent a year at the university. Here he was to write the seventh volume in his book series The Art of Computer Programming, a volume that was to deal with programming languages. However, Knuth had only finished the first two volumes when he came to Oslo, and thus spent the year on the third volume next to teaching. The third volume in the series was published shortly after Knuth returned to Stanford University in 1972. Knuth's stay in Oslo also led to many from the university being given the opportunity to stay at Stanford.

In the beginning, the newly started Department of Informatics was housed in the Mathematics Building at Blindern. However, as there was a great shortage of space, the offices were scattered around on many different floors. After a couple of years, the department was moved to the physics building. However, the space problems persisted, and a process was initiated for the construction of a separate building for informatics. Central to this process were, among others, Lars Walløe, who brought with him rector Bjarne Waaler and Gudmund Harlem of NTNF on the plans for a new building in Gaustadbekkdalen. The building, now named after Kristen Nygaard, was completed in 1988, and would house the department, the Norwegian Computing Center and the university's center for Information Technology.

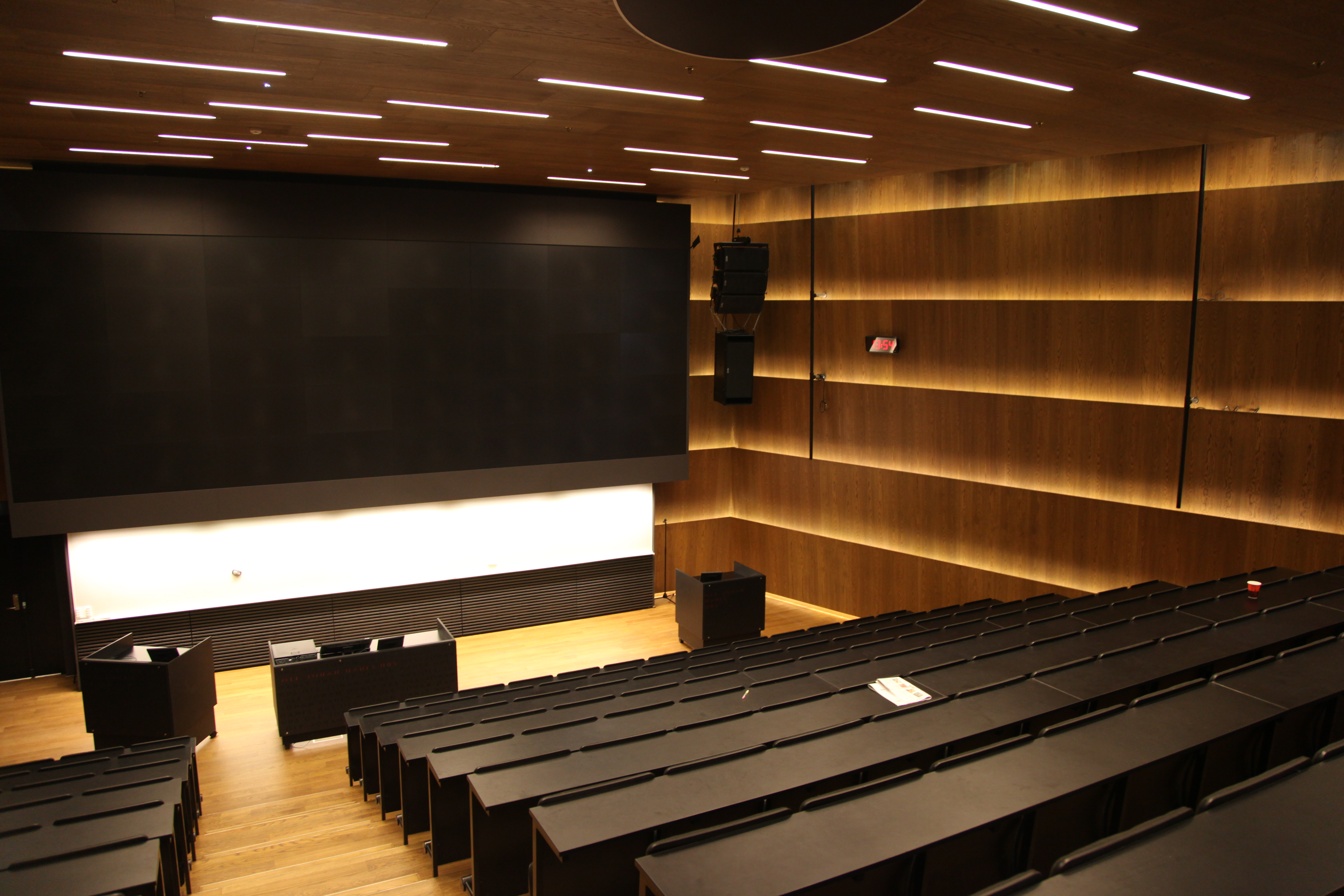
The Simula auditorium in Ole-Johan Dahls House.

In 1983, Pål Spilling established the first functioning TCP/IP-based data network in Norway and Europe. The network connected the computer environments at the universities of Oslo, Bergen and Trondheim, as well as the local network at Kjeller, which in turn ensured connection to the United States. This was the first local network outside USA to be connected to the American Internet. Spilling along with his colleagues and fellow countrymen Dag Belsnes and Yngvar Lundh, later ended up on the list of 33 Internet pioneers in the world that were most significant in the development of basic Internet-technology. Their names are engraved into the bronze plaque roll of honour "Birth of the Internet" plaque at Stanford university in California. All three also received a Rosing Honorary Prize for their work on the development of the Internet. Both Spilling and Belsnes worked as professors at the department until their retirement. In 2021, Lundh and Spilling was inducted into the Internet Hall of Fame.

Lack of space began to reappear in the early 2000s. In 2005, the ready signal was given to build a new building for computer science, the so-called "ifi2" building. At that time, the department was spread over several locations in Gaustadbekkdalen beyond the informatics building, such as Forskningsparken. The new building Ole-Johan Dahl's house, named after Norway's first professor of computer science, was opened in 2011. The building is located next to Kristen Nygaard's house, Norwegian Computing Center, Oslo Science Park and SINTEF.

== Student life ==
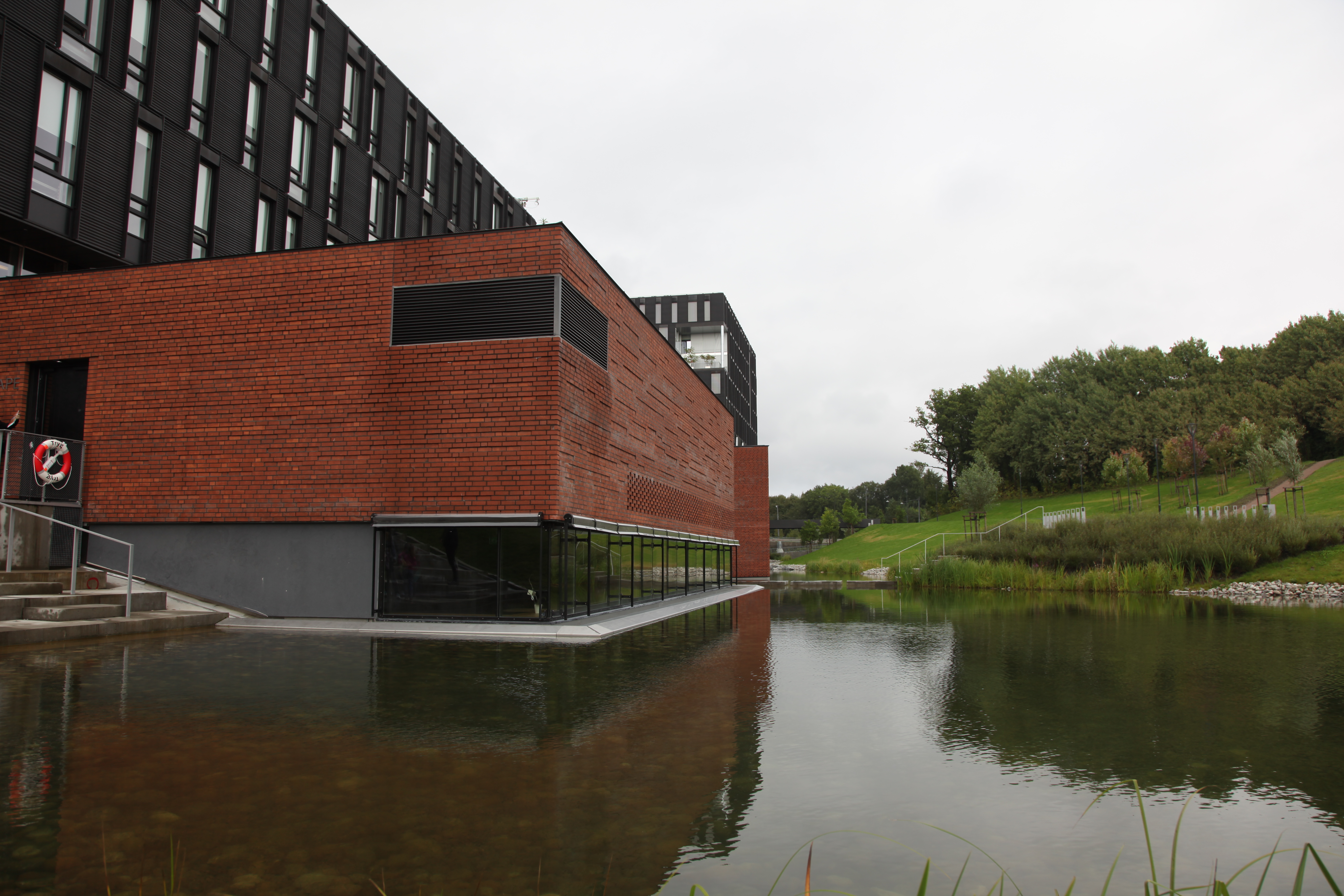
Entrance to Escape (left corner), the pub and café is operated by Cybernetisk Selskab.

The department has over 15 types of student societies in a variety of different topics, ranging from sports-related to professional associations. One of the most notable societies is Cybernetisk Selskab (CYB), which is the oldest student society at the department, having been established in 1969 and registered through SiO. CYB operates a pub and café in the basement of the department, called Escape.

Escape has since 2012 been run as a café five days a week. In addition, a student pub is held every Friday, as well as various other events such as board game night, whiskey seminars, the Thursday club and theme parties. CYB is also arranging skiing trips to Hemsedal, gala at the department and other types of events for students at the department. Escape was in 2017 named Oslo's best student pub.

== Notable people ==
Some of the notable people associated with the department includes:

- Kristen Nygaard and Ole-Johan Dahl - Co-inventors of object-oriented programming, recipients of the 2001 Turing Award.
- Donald Knuth - "Father of the analysis of algorithms," awarded the 1974 Turing Award.
- Gisle Hannemyr - Entrepreneur, net guru, and evangelist.
- Trygve Reenskaug - Formulated the model–view–controller (MVC) and developed Object Oriented Role Analysis and Modeling (OOram).
- Hans Petter Langtangen - Professor of scientific computing and director of the Centre for Biomedical Computing.
- Lars Monrad-Krohn - Serial entrepreneur who established Norsk Data, the second largest company in Norway at its peak in 1987.
- Pål Spilling - Internet pioneer who brought the Internet to Europe and Norway, posthumously inducted into the Internet Hall of Fame.
- Rolf Nordhagen - Key figure in the development of the modern Internet, posthumously inducted into the Internet Hall of Fame.
- Håkon Wium Lie - Developer of Cascading Style Sheets (CSS) and former chief technology officer of Opera Software.
- Torleiv Maseng - Made significant contributions to the development of radio technology in GSM.
