= List of pioneers in computer science =

This is a list of people who made transformative breakthroughs in the creation, development and imagining of what computers could do.

== Pioneers ==
Achievement date	Person	Achievement
1977	Adleman, Leonard	Co-invented the RSA algorithm with Ron Rivest and Adi Shamir, making public-key cryptography useful in practice.
1944	Aiken, Howard	Conceived and co-designed the Harvard Mark I.
830~	Al-Khwarizmi	The term algorithm is derived from the algorism, the technique of performing arithmetic with Hindu–Arabic numerals popularised by al-Khwarizmi in his book On the Calculation with Hindu Numerals.
1970, 1989	Allen, Frances E.	Developed bit vector notation and program control-flow graphs; first female IBM Fellow (1989); first female recipient of the ACM's Turing Award (2006).
1954, 1964, 1967	Amdahl, Gene	Pioneer of mainframe computing; designed IBM 704; chief architect of IBM System/360. Formulated Amdahl's law; also worked on IBM 709 and IBM 7030 Stretch.
1939	Atanasoff, John	Built the first electronic digital computer, the Atanasoff–Berry Computer, though it was neither programmable nor Turing-complete.
1822, 1837	Babbage, Charles	Originated the concept of a programmable general-purpose computer; designed the Analytical Engine and built a prototype for a less powerful mechanical calculator, often called "Father of the Computer".
1973	Bachman, Charles	Outstanding contributions to database technology.
1954, 1963	Backus, John	Led the team that created FORTRAN (Formula Translation), the first practical high-level programming language, and formulated the Backus–Naur form that described the formal language syntax.
850~	Banū Mūsā	Three brothers who wrote the Book of Ingenious Devices, describing what appears to be the first programmable machine, an automatic flute player.
1960–1964	Baran, Paul	One of two independent inventors of the concept of digital packet switching used in modern computer networking including the Internet. Published a series of briefings and papers about dividing information into "message blocks" and sending them over distributed networks (1960–1964).
1874	Baudot, Émile	French telegraphic engineer; patented the Baudot code, the first means of digital communication. The modem speed unit baud is named after him.
1960s	Bauer, Friedrich L.	Proposed the stack for expression evaluation, with Edsger W. Dijkstra. Influential in establishing computer science as an independent discipline of science; coined the term software engineering. Contributed to numerical analysis, fundamentals of interpretation and translation of programming languages, systematics of program development, program transformation, and cryptology.
1953	Bellman, Richard E.	American applied mathematician who introduced dynamic programming (1953)
2018	Bengio, Yoshua; Hinton, Geoffrey; Lecun, Yann	Conceptual and engineering breakthroughs that have made deep neural networks a critical component of computing
1989, 1990	Berners-Lee, Tim	Invented the World Wide Web and sent the first HTTP communication between client and server.
1995	Blum, Manuel	Contributions to the foundations of computational complexity theory and its application to cryptography and program checking
1981 & 1986	Boehm, Barry	Invented parametric cost modeling (which he called "Constructive Cost Model") for software and software-intensive systems (COCOMO). Invented the spiral method of software development (spiral model).
1847, 1854	Boole, George	Formalized Boolean algebra, the basis for digital logic and computer science.
1966	Böhm, Corrado	Theorized of the concept of structured programming.
1947	Booth, Kathleen	Invented the first assembly language.
1969, 1978	Brinch Hansen, Per	Developed the RC 4000 multiprogramming system, which introduced the concept of an operating system kernel and the separation of policy and mechanism; effectively the first microkernel architecture. Co-developed the monitor with Tony Hoare, and created the first monitor implementation. Implemented the first form of remote procedure call in the RC 4000, and was first to propose remote procedure calls as a structuring concept for distributed computing.
1959, 1995	Brooks, Fred	Manager of IBM System/360 and OS/360 projects; author of The Mythical Man-Month.
1908	Brouwer, Luitzen Egbertus Jan	Founded intuitionistic logic, which later came to prevalent use in proof assistants.
1954	Burks, Arthur	Proposed Reverse Polish Notation with Don Warren and Jesse Wright in 1954, unaware of Konrad Zuse's earlier use of postfix notation in his Z3 in 1941, and later independently reinvented by Friedrich L. Bauer and Edsger W. Dijkstra for use with stacks.
1930	Bush, Vannevar	Analogue computing pioneer; originator of the Memex concept, which led to the development of Hypertext
1951	Caminer, David	With John Pinkerton, developed the LEO computer, the first business computer, for J. Lyons and Co
1974	Catmull, Edwin	Computer generated imagery (CGI) and 3D graphics pioneer who developed texture mapping, the Catmull-Clark subdivision surface algorithm (with Jim Clark), and the Catmull-Rom spline (with Raphael Rom. Former vice president of Industrial Light & Magic and co-founder of and former president of Pixar
1978	Cerf, Vint	With Bob Kahn, designed the Transmission Control Protocol and Internet Protocol (TCP/IP), the primary communication protocols of the Internet and other computer networks.
1956	Chomsky, Noam	Made contributions to computer science with his work in linguistics. Developed Chomsky hierarchy, directly impacting programming language theory and other branches of computer science.
1936	Church, Alonzo	Made fundamental contributions to theoretical computer science, specifically in the development of computability theory in the form of lambda calculus. Independently of Alan Turing, formulated what is now known as the Church-Turing Thesis and proved that first-order logic is undecidable.
1962	Clark, Wesley A.	Designed LINC, the first functional computer scaled down and priced for individual users (1963). Many of its features are considered prototypes of essential elements of personal computers.
1981	Clarke, Edmund M.	Developed model checking and formal verification of software and hardware, with E. Allen Emerson.
1987	Cocke, John	Significant contributions to compiler design and theory, the architecture of large systems, and the development of reduced instruction set computers (RISC)
1970	Codd, Edgar F.	Proposed and formalized the relational model of data management, the theoretical basis of relational databases
1971	Conway, Lynn	Superscalar architecture with multiple-issue out-of-order dynamic instruction scheduling
1967	Cook, Stephen	Formalized the notion of NP-completeness, inspiring a great deal of research in computational complexity theory
1965	Cooley, James	With John W. Tukey, created the fast Fourier transform
1944	Coombs, Allen	Designed and built the Mark II Colossus computers; superseded the Mark I version (which was the world's first digital, electronic computing device)
1989	Corbató, Fernando J.	Pioneering work organizing the concepts and leading the development of the general-purpose, large-scale, time-sharing and resource-sharing computer systems CTSS and Multics
1964–1996	Cray, Seymour	Designed a series of computers that were the fastest in the world for decades; and founded Cray Research, which built many of them; credited with creating the supercomputer industry
1978, 1993	Cutler, David N.	Major pioneer of operating-system design through his work at Digital Equipment Corporation and Microsoft, where he was lead engineer of the VMS and Windows NT kernels (respectively)
1962	Dahl, Ole-Johan	With Kristen Nygaard, invented the proto-object oriented language SIMULA
1965	Davies, Donald	One of two independent inventors of the concept of digital packet switching used in modern computer networking including the Internet. Conceived of and named the concept for data communication networks (1965–66). Many of the wide-area packet-switched networks of the 1970s, including ARPANET, were similar "in nearly all respects" to his original 1965 design.
1976	Diffie, Whitfield	Fundamental contributions to modern cryptography. Diffie and Hellman's groundbreaking 1976 paper "New Directions in Cryptography" introduced the ideas of public-key cryptography and digital signatures, the foundation of security protocols used on the Internet today.
1968	Dijkstra, Edsger W.	Pioneered the shortest path algorithm; coined the term structured programming; invented the semaphore; famously suggested that the GOTO statement should be considered harmful
2006	Duda, Jarosław	Introduced first Asymmetric numeral systems entropy coding
1918	Eccles, William and Jordan, Frank Wilfred	Patented the Eccles–Jordan trigger circuit, the so-called "bistable flip-flop", a building block of all digital memory cells. Built from vacuum tubes, their concept was essential for the success of the Colossus codebreaking computer.
1943, 1951	Eckert, J. Presper	With John Mauchly, designed and built ENIAC, the first modern (all electronic, Turing-complete) computer; and UNIVAC I, the first commercially available computer
1981	Emerson, E. Allen	Developed model checking and formal verification of software and hardware, with Edmund M. Clarke
1963	Engelbart, Douglas	Best known for inventing the computer mouse, with Bill English; pioneer of human–computer interaction whose Augment team developed hypertext, networked computers, and precursors to GUIs
1971	Faggin, Federico	Designed the first commercial microprocessor, Intel 4004
1994	Feigenbaum, Edward	Pioneering the design and construction of large-scale artificial intelligence systems, demonstrating the practical importance and potential commercial impact of artificial intelligence technology
1974	Feinler, Elizabeth	Led team that defined a simple text file format for Internet host names, which became the Domain Name System; her group became the naming authority for the top-level domains of .mil, .gov, .edu, .org, and .com
1943	Flowers, Tommy	Designed and built the Mark I Colossus computer, the world's first programmable, digital, electronic, computing devices
1978	Floyd, Robert W.	Had a clear influence on methodologies for the creation of efficient and reliable software; helped to found these important sub-fields of computer science: theory of parsing, semantics of programming languages, automatic program verification, automatic program synthesis, and analysis of algorithms
1994	Floyd, Sally	Founded the field of Active Queue Management; co-invented Random Early Detection, used in almost all Internet routers
1879	Frege, Gottlob	Extended Aristotelian logic with first-order predicate calculus independently of Charles Sanders Peirce, a crucial precursor in computability theory; also relevant to early work on artificial intelligence, logic programming
1985	Furber, Stephen; Wilson, Sophie	Led the creation of the ARM 32-bit RISC microprocessor
1958, 1961, 1967	Ginsburg, Seymour	Proved "don't-care" circuit minimization does not necessarily yield optimal results; proved that the ALGOL programming language was context-free (linking formal language theory to the problem of compiler writing); invented AFL Theory
1931	Gödel, Kurt	Proved that Peano arithmetic could not be both logically consistent and complete in first-order predicate calculus. Church, Kleene, and Turing developed the foundations of computation theory based on corollaries to Gödel's work.
1989	Goldwasser, Shafi	Invented zero-knowledge proofs with Micali and Rackoff; she and Micali received the Turing Award (2012) for this and other work.
2011	Graham, Susan L.	Awarded the 2009 IEEE John von Neumann Medal for "contributions to programming language design and implementation and for exemplary service to the discipline of computer science"
1953	Gray, Frank	Physicist and researcher at Bell Labs, developed the reflected binary code (RBC) or Gray code. Gray's methodologies are used for error detection and correction in digital communication systems, such as QAM in digital subscriber line networks.
1974, 2005	Gray, Jim	Innovator in database systems and transaction processing implementation
1986, 1990	Grosz, Barbara	Created the first computational model of discourse, establishing the field of research and influencing language-processing technologies; developed SharedPlans model for collaboration in multi-agent systems
1988, 2015	Gustafson, John	Proved the viability of parallel computing experimentally and theoretically; formulated Gustafson's Law; developed high-efficiency formats for representing real numbers Unum and Posit
1971	Hamilton, Margaret	Developed the concepts of asynchronous software, priority scheduling, end-to-end testing, and human-in-the-loop decision capability, such as priority displays which then became the foundation for ultra-reliable software design
1950	Hamming, Richard	Created the fields of error-correcting code, Hamming code, Hamming matrix, the Hamming window, Hamming numbers, sphere-packing (or Hamming bound), and the Hamming distance; established the concept of perfect code
1956, 1958, 1974	Händler, Wolfgang	Pioneering work on automata theory, parallel computing, artificial intelligence, man-machine interfaces and computer graphics; one of the lead architects of the TR 4 supercomputer; invented Händler diagrams for logic function minimization; devised the Erlangen Classification System (ECS) for parallel computers
2019	Hanrahan, Pat	Fundamental contributions to 3D computer graphics, with revolutionary impact on computer-generated imagery (CGI) in filmmaking and other applications
1993	Hartmanis, Juris	Foundations for the field of computational complexity theory
1981, 1995, 1999	Hejlsberg, Anders	Author of Turbo Pascal at Borland; chief architect of Delphi; designer and lead architect of C# and TypeScript at Microsoft
1976	Hellman, Martin	Fundamental contributions to modern cryptography. Diffie and Hellman's groundbreaking 1976 paper, "New Directions in Cryptography", introduced the ideas of public-key cryptography and digital signatures, the foundation for security protocols on the Internet today
2017	Hennessy, John L.	Pioneered a systematic, quantitative approach to the design and evaluation of computer architectures with enduring impact on the microprocessor industry
2008, 2012, 2018	Hinton, Geoffrey	Popularized and enabled the use of artificial neural networks and deep learning, among the most successful tools in modern artificial intelligence efforts; received the Turing Award (2018) for conceptual and engineering breakthroughs that have made deep neural networks a critical component of computing
1961, 1969, 1978, 1980	Hoare, C. A. R.	Developed the formal language Communicating Sequential Processes (CSP), Hoare logic for verifying program correctness, and Quicksort; fundamental contributions to the definition and design of programming languages
1968	Holberton, Betty	Wrote the first mainframe sort merge on the Univac
1889	Hollerith, Herman	Widely regarded as the father of modern machine data processing, his invention of the punched card tabulating machine marked the beginning of the era of semiautomatic data processing systems
1986	Hopcroft, John	Fundamental achievements in the design and analysis of algorithms and data structures
1952	Hopper, Grace	Pioneered work on the necessity for high-level programming languages, which she termed automatic programming; wrote the A-O compiler, which heavily influenced the COBOL language
1997	Hsu Feng-hsiung	Work leading to the creation of the Deep Thought chess computer; architect and principal designer IBM Deep Blue chess computer that defeated the reigning World Chess Champion, Garry Kasparov, in 1997
1952	Huffman, David	Created Huffman coding
1952	Hurd, Cuthbert	Helped IBM develop its first general-purpose computer, the IBM 701
1945, 1953	Huskey, Harry	Contributions to the design of early computers including ENIAC, EDVAC, Pilot ACE, EDVAC, SEAC, SWAC, and Bendix G-15 (the latter described as the first personal computer, being operable by one person)
1954, 1962	Iverson, Kenneth	Helped establish and taught the first graduate course in computer science (at Harvard); invented the APL programming language; contributions to interactive computing
1801	Jacquard, Joseph Marie	Built and demonstrated the Jacquard loom, a programmable mechanized loom controlled by a tape constructed from punched cards
1206	Al-Jazari	Invented programmable machines, including programmable humanoid robots, and the castle clock, an astronomical clock considered the first programmable analog computer
1976–1999	Joy, Bill	Created the ex and vi text editors, the first version of the Berkeley Software Distribution, the C Shell, and a high-performance TCP/IP Stack. Went on to found Sun Microsystems, and would be involved in the creation of the SPARC architecture and the Solaris operating system. In addition, he authored the original Java Language Specification for the Java programming language and spearheaded the development of Jini, a framework designed to allow devices to plug into a network and spontaneously offer their services. He is also the namesake for Joy's law.
1989	Kahan, William	Fundamental contributions to numerical analysis; foremost expert on floating-point computations; dedicated to "making the world safe for numerical computations"
1978	Kahn, Bob	Designed the Transmission Control Protocol and Internet Protocol (TCP/IP), the primary communication protocols of the Internet and other computer networks.
1952, 1953	Karnaugh, Maurice	Creator of the Karnaugh map, a variation on Edward Veitch's Veitch chart; rediscovery of Allan Marquand's much earlier logical diagram used for logic function minimization
1985	Karp, Richard M.	Contributions to algorithm theory, including the development of efficient algorithms for network flow and other combinatorial optimization problems; identified polynomial-time computability with the intuitive notion of algorithmic efficiency; contributed to the theory of NP-completeness
1973	Karpinski, Jacek	Developed the first differential analyzer using transistors; developed one of the first machine-learning algorithms for character and image recognition; invented of one of the first minicomputers, the K-202
1970~	Kay, Alan	Pioneered many ideas at the root of object-oriented programming languages; led the team that developed Smalltalk; made fundamental contributions to personal computing
1948–1990s	Kilburn, Tom	With Freddie Williams he worked on the Williams–Kilburn tube and developed the world's first electronic stored-program computer, the Manchester Baby, while working at the University of Manchester. His work propelled Manchester and Britain into the forefront of the emerging field of computer science. He also worked on the development of Atlas, one of the most powerful supercomputer in 1960s.
1972–1994	Kildall, Gary	Introduced the theory of data-flow analysis in optimizing compilers (global expression optimization, Kildall's method). Worked on instruction set emulators (INTERP), found an innovative software relocation method (page boundary relocation), and laid the foundation to the concepts of binary recompilation (XLT86). Developed the first high-level programming language and compiler for microcomputers (PL/M) and the first mainstream operating system for microcomputers (CP/M). Invented the concept of a hardware abstraction layer called the BIOS, with both conceptually laying the foundation to all disk operating systems on personal computers. Worked on diskette track buffering schemes, read-ahead algorithms, virtual disk drives, and file system caching. Developed the first computer interface for video disks and pioneered CD-ROM file systems, introducing the first encyclopedia for computers (The Electronic Encyclopedia). Pioneered a modular PBX communication system integrating land-lines with mobile phones (Intelliphone) and to remotely connect with home appliances.
1957	Kirsch, Russell Gray	Whilst working for the National Bureau of Standards (NBS), Kirsch used a recently developed image scanner to scan and store the first digital photograph. His scanned photo of his three-month-old son was deemed by Life magazine as one of the "100 Photographs That Changed The World".
1961–1970s	Kleinrock, Leonard	Pioneered the application of queueing theory to model delays in message switching networks in his Ph.D. thesis in 1961–1962, published as a book in 1964. In the 1970s, he applied queueing theory to model the performance of packet switching networks. His mathematical insights addressed the calculation of waiting times, queue lengths, and throughput in packet networks, which enabled the modelling of data flow, delays and congestion in computer networks. His theoretical work on hierarchical routing in the late 1970s with student Farouk Kamoun remains critical to the operation of the Internet today.
1936, 1951	Kleene, Stephen Cole	Developed the Herbrand–Gödel notion of general recursive functions, and proved their equivalence to Church's lambda calculus, which he helped extend, establishing key foundations of computability theory. Pioneered automata theory; introduced regular expressions to describe regular languages.
1968, 1989	Knuth, Donald	Wrote The Art of Computer Programming and created TeX. Coined the term "analysis of algorithms" and made major contributions to that field, including popularizing Big O notation.
1990–1993	Lam, Simon S.	Lam was inducted into the Internet Hall of Fame (2023) by the Internet Society for “inventing secure sockets in 1991 and implementing the first secure sockets layer, named SNP, in 1993.” In 1990, he conceived the idea of a new security sublayer in the Internet protocol stack. This way, application programmers do not need to know much about implementation details for security. Also, the upper interface of the sublayer would enable implementation changes in the future. Lam's idea of a sublayer which offers a “secure sockets interface” to applications was novel and a radical departure from contemporary security research for Internet applications (e.g., MIT's Kerberos, 1988–1992). SNP was created for Internet applications in general. Subsequent secure sockets layers, SSL and TLS, developed years later for commercial browsers, followed the same architecture and key ideas of SNP. Today, TLS 1.3 is used not only for all e-commerce applications (banking, shopping, etc.) on WWW, but also for email, and many other Internet applications.
1974, 1978	Lamport, Leslie	Formulated algorithms to solve many fundamental problems in distributed systems (e.g. the bakery algorithm). Developed the concept of a logical clock, enabling synchronization between distributed entities based on the events through which they communicate. Created LaTeX.
1972	Lampson, Butler W.	Development of distributed, personal computing environments and the technology for their implementation: workstations, networks, operating systems, programming systems, displays, security and document publishing.
1964–1966	Landin, Peter	Used the lambda calculus to formally specify the semantics of programming languages, and developed an early functional programming language named ISWIM.
1951	Lebedev, Sergei Alekseyevich	Independently designed the first electronic computer in the Soviet Union, MESM, in Kiev, Ukraine.
1670~	Leibniz, Gottfried	Made advances in symbolic logic, such as the Calculus ratiocinator, that were heavily influential on Gottlob Frege. He anticipated later developments in first-order predicate calculus, which were crucial for the theoretical foundations of computer science.
1960	Licklider, J. C. R.	Began the investigation of human–computer interaction, leading to many advances in computer interfaces as well as in cybernetics and artificial intelligence. A main person on List of Internet pioneers. Arguably, initiator and the key person in inception of the idea of ARPANET and hence, Internet.
1987	Liskov, Barbara	Developed the Liskov substitution principle, which guarantees semantic interoperability of data types in a hierarchy.
1300~	Llull, Ramon	Designed multiple symbolic representations machines, and pioneered notions of symbolic representation and manipulation to produce knowledge—both of which were major influences on Leibniz.
1852	Lovelace, Ada	An English mathematician and writer, chiefly known for her work on Charles Babbage's proposed mechanical general-purpose computer, the Analytical Engine. She was the first to recognize that the machine had applications beyond pure calculation, and created the first algorithm intended to be carried out by such a machine. As a result, she is often regarded as the first to recognize the full potential of a "computing machine" and the first computer programmer.
1909	Ludgate, Percy	Charles Babbage in 1843 and Percy Ludgate in 1909 designed the first two Analytical Engines in history. Ludgate's engine used multiplication as its basis (using his own discrete Irish logarithms), had the first multiplier-accumulator (MAC), was first to exploit a MAC to perform division, stored numbers as displacements of rods in shuttles, and had several other novel features, including for program control.
1971	Martin-Löf, Per	Published an early draft on the type theory that many proof assistants build on.
1943, 1951	Mauchly, John	With J. Presper Eckert, designed and built the ENIAC, the first modern (all electronic, Turing-complete) computer, and the UNIVAC I, the first commercially available computer. Also worked on BINAC (1949), EDVAC (1949), UNIVAC (1951) with Grace Hopper and Jean Bartik, to develop early stored program computers.
1958	McCarthy, John	Invented LISP, a functional programming language.
1956, 2012	McCluskey, Edward J.	Fundamental contributions that shaped the design and testing of digital systems, including the first algorithm for digital logic synthesis, the Quine-McCluskey logic minimization method.
1986	Meyer, Bertrand	Developed design by contract in the guise of the Eiffel programming language.
2012	Micali, Silvio	For transformative work that laid the complexity-theoretic foundations for the science of cryptography and in the process pioneered new methods for efficient verification of mathematical proofs in complexity theory.
1991	Milner, Robin	1) LCF, the mechanization of Scott's Logic of Computable Functions, probably the first theoretically based yet practical tool for machine assisted proof construction; 2) ML, the first language to include polymorphic type inference together with a type-safe exception-handling mechanism; 3) CCS, a general theory of concurrency. In addition, he formulated and strongly advanced full abstraction, the study of the relationship between operational and denotational semantics.
1963	Minsky, Marvin	Co-founder of Artificial Intelligence Lab at Massachusetts Institute of Technology, author of several texts on AI and philosophy. Critic of the perceptron.
1968	Moore, Charles H.	Inventor of the Forth programming language.
2008	Nakamoto, Satoshi	The anonymous creator or creators of Bitcoin, the first peer-to-peer digital currency. Nakamoto's 2008 white-paper introduced the concept of the blockchain, a database structure that allows full trust in the decentralized and distributed public transaction ledger of the cryptocurrency.
1934, 1938	Nakashima Akira	NEC engineer introduced switching circuit theory in papers from 1934 to 1936, laying the foundations for digital circuit design, in digital computers and other areas of modern technology.
1960	Naur, Peter	Edited the ALGOL 60 Revised Report, introducing Backus-Naur form
1945	Neumann, John von	Formulated the von Neumann architecture upon which most modern computers are based.
1956	Newell, Allen	Together with J. C. Shaw and Herbert Simon, the three co-wrote the Logic Theorist, the first true AI program, in the first list-processing language, which influenced LISP.
1943	Newman, Max	Instigated the production of the Colossus computers at Bletchley Park. After the second world war he established the Computing Machine Laboratory at the University of Manchester where he created the project that built the world's first stored-program computer, the Manchester Baby.
1962	Nygaard, Kristen	With Ole-Johan Dahl, invented the proto-object oriented language SIMULA.
1642	Pascal, Blaise	Invented the mechanical calculator.
5th century BCE	Pāṇini	Invented first formal Grammar. Also gave early forms of Backus-Naur form
2017	Patterson, David	For pioneering a systematic, quantitative approach to the design and evaluation of computer architectures with enduring impact on the microprocessor industry.
1991	Pawlak, Zdzisław	Introduced and published fundamental works on the rough set theory
2011	Pearl, Judea	Fundamental contributions to artificial intelligence through the development of a calculus for probabilistic and causal reasoning.
1952	Perlis, Alan	On Project Whirlwind, member of the team that developed the ALGOL programming language, and the first recipient of the Turing Award
1985	Perlman, Radia	Invented the Spanning Tree Protocol (STP), which is fundamental to the operation of network bridges, while working for Digital Equipment Corporation. Has done extensive and innovative research, particularly on encryption and networking. She received the USENIX Lifetime Achievement Award in 2007, among numerous others.
1964	Perotto, Pier Giorgio	Computer designer for Olivetti, designed one of the first electronic programmable calculators, the Programma 101
1932	Péter, Rózsa	Published a series of papers grounding recursion theory as a separate area of mathematical research, setting the foundation for theoretical computer science.
1995	Picard, Rosalind	Founded Affective Computing, and laid the foundations for giving computers skills of emotional intelligence.
1996	Pnueli, Amir	Introducing temporal logic into computing science and for outstanding contributions to program and systems verification.
1936	Post, Emil L.	Developed the Post machine as a model of computation, independently of Turing. Known also for developing truth tables, the Post correspondence problem used in recursion theory as well as proving what is known as Post's theorem.
1976	Rabin, Michael O.	The joint paper "Finite Automata and Their Decision Problems", which introduced the idea of nondeterministic machines, which has proved to be an enormously valuable concept. Their (Scott & Rabin) classic paper has been a continuous source of inspiration for subsequent work in this field.
1994	Reddy, Raj	Pioneering the design and construction of large scale artificial intelligence systems, demonstrating the practical importance and potential commercial impact of artificial intelligence technology.
1967–2011	Ritchie, Dennis	With Ken Thompson, pioneered the C programming language and the Unix computer operating system at Bell Labs.
1977	Rivest, Ron	Co-invented the RSA algorithm with Adi Shamir and Leonard Adleman, making public-key cryptography useful in practice.
1958–1960	Rosen, Saul	Designed the software of the first transistor-based computer. Also influenced the ALGOL programming language.
1975, 1985	Rubin, Philip	Developed pioneering computational speech synthesis systems for use in the experimental study of speech perception and production, including articulatory synthesis and sinewave synthesis. Also designed the HADES signal processing system, a predecessor of MATLAB.
1910	Russell, Bertrand	Made contributions to computer science with his work on mathematical logic (example: truth function). Introduced the notion of type theory. He also introduced type system (along with Alfred North Whitehead) in his work, Principia Mathematica.
1975	Salton, Gerard	A pioneer of automatic information retrieval, who proposed the vector space model and the inverted index.
1962	Sammet, Jean E.	Developed the FORMAC programming language. She was also the first to write extensively about the history and categorization of programming languages in 1969, and became the first female president of the Association for Computing Machinery in 1974.
1880, 1898	Sanders Peirce, Charles	Proved the functional completeness of the NOR gate. Proposed the implementation of logic via electrical circuits, decades before Claude Shannon. Extended Aristotelian logic with first-order predicate calculus, independently of Gottlob Frege, a crucial precursor in computability theory. Also relevant to early work on artificial intelligence, logic programming.
1976	Scott, Dana	The joint paper "Finite Automata and Their Decision Problems", which introduced the idea of nondeterministic machines, which has proved to be an enormously valuable concept. Their (Scott & Rabin) classic paper has been a continuous source of inspiration for subsequent work in this field.
1977	Shamir, Adi	Co-invented the RSA algorithm with Ron Rivest and Leonard Adleman, making public-key cryptography useful in practice.
1937, 1948	Shannon, Claude	Founded information theory, and laid foundations for practical digital circuit design.
1971	Shima Masatoshi	Designed the Intel 4004, the first commercial microprocessor, as well as the Intel 8080, Zilog Z80 and Zilog Z8000 microprocessors, and the Intel 8259, 8255, 8253, 8257 and 8251 chips.
1997 to 1999	Siegel, Neil	He is the documented earliest creator of a complete, operating adaptation of the internet to fully routed wireless operation, and many important / related technologies that are widely used today in such wireless devices. wireless internet
2007	Sifakis, Joseph	Developing model checking into a highly effective verification technology, widely adopted in the hardware and software industries.
1956, 1957	Simon, Herbert A.	A political scientist and economist who pioneered artificial intelligence. Co-creator of the Logic Theory Machine and the General Problem Solver programs.
1953	Spärck Jones, Karen	One of the pioneers of information retrieval and natural language processing.
1972	Stallman, Richard	Stallman launched the GNU Project in September 1983 to create a Unix-like computer operating system composed entirely of free software. With this, he also launched the free software movement.
1993	Stearns, Richard E.	Foundations for the field of computational complexity theory.
1981	Stepanov, Alexander	Stepanov is one of the pioneers when it comes to Generic Programming and he is also the primary designer and implementer of the C++ Standard Template Library.
1937, 1941	Stibitz, George R.	Father of modern digital computing and remote job entry. Coined the term "digital". Discovered the reflected binary code known as Gray code. Excess-3 code is named after him as well (Stibitz code).
1982	Stonebraker, Michael	Revolutionized the field of database management systems (DBMSs) and founded multiple successful database companies
1979	Stroustrup, Bjarne	Invented C++ at Bell Labs
1963	Sutherland, Ivan	Author of Sketchpad, the ancestor of modern computer-aided drafting (CAD) programs and one of the early examples of object-oriented programming.
1986	Tarjan, Robert	Fundamental achievements in the design and analysis of algorithms and data structures.
1973	Thacker, Charles P.	Pioneering design and realization of the Xerox Alto, the first modern personal computer, and in addition for his contributions to the Ethernet and the Tablet PC.
1972, 1973	Thi, André Truong Trong and François Gernelle	Invention of the Micral N, the earliest commercial, non-kit personal computer based on a microprocessor.
1967	Thompson, Ken	Created the Unix operating system, the B programming language, Plan 9 operating system, the first machine to achieve a Master rating in chess, and the UTF-8 encoding at Bell Labs and the Go programming language at Google.
1993	Toh, Chai Keong	Created mobile ad hoc networking; Implemented the first working wireless ad hoc network of laptop computers in 1998 using Linux OS, Lucent WaveLan 802.11 radios, and a new distributed routing protocol transparent to TCP/UDP/IP.
1912, 1914	Torres Quevedo, Leonardo	In 1912, Leonardo Torres Quevedo built El Ajedrecista (the chess player), one of the first autonomous machines capable of playing chess. As opposed to the human-operated The Turk and Ajeeb, El Ajedrecista was a true automaton built to play chess without human guidance. It played an endgame with three chess pieces, automatically moving a white king and a rook to checkmate the black king moved by a human opponent. In his work Essays on Automatics, published in 1914, Torres Quevedo formulates what will be a new branch of engineering: automation and designed an electromechanical version of Babbage's Analytical engine which introduced floating-point arithmetic.
1991	Torvalds, Linus	Created the first version of the Linux kernel and the distributed version control system Git.
1965	Tukey, John W.	With James Cooley, created the fast Fourier transform. He invented the term "bit".
1936	Turing, Alan	Made several fundamental contributions to theoretical computer science, including the Turing machine computational model, the conceiving of the stored program concept and the designing of the high-speed ACE design. Independently of Alonzo Church, he formulated the Church-Turing thesis and proved that first-order logic is undecidable. He also explored the philosophical issues concerning artificial intelligence, proposing what is now known as Turing test.
2010	Valiant, Leslie	Transformative contributions to the theory of computation, including the theory of probably approximately correct (PAC) learning, the complexity of enumeration and of algebraic computation, and the theory of parallel and distributed computing.
1875, 1875	Verea, Ramón	Designed and patented the Verea Direct Multiplier, the first mechanical direct multiplier.
1950~	Wang An	Made key contributions to the development of magnetic core memory.
1955, 1960s, 1974	Ware, Willis	Co-designer of JOHNNIAC. Chaired committee that developed the Code of Fair Information Practice and led to the Privacy Act of 1974. Vice-chair of the Privacy Protection Study Commission.
1964, 1966	Weizenbaum, Joseph	One of the fathers of modern artificial intelligence. Creator of the ELIZA program using natural language processing to emulate conversations with a psychologist.
1968	Wijngaarden, Adriaan van	Developer of the W-grammar first used in the definition of ALGOL 68
1949	Wilkes, Maurice	Built the first practical stored program computer (EDSAC) to be completed and for being credited with the ideas of several high-level programming language constructs.
1970	Wilkinson, James H.	Research in numerical analysis to facilitate the use of the high-speed digital computer, having received special recognition for his work in computations in linear algebra and "backward" error analysis.
1970, 1978	Wirth, Niklaus	Designed the Pascal, Modula-2 and Oberon programming languages.
2000	Yao, Andrew	Fundamental contributions to the theory of computation, including the complexity-based theory of pseudorandom number generation, cryptography, and communication complexity.
1955–1958	Zemanek, Heinz	Developed an early fully transistorized computer, the Mailüfterl. Crucial in the creation of the formal definition of the programming language PL/I.
1938, 1945	Zuse, Konrad	Built the first digital freely programmable computer, the Z1. Built the first functional program-controlled computer, the Z3 in 1941. The Z3 already used what later became known as Reverse Polish Notation, and it was proven to be Turing-complete in 1998. Produced the world's first commercial computer, the Z4. Designed the first high-level programming language, Plankalkül.

~ Items marked with a tilde are circa dates.

== See also ==
- Computer Pioneer Award
- IEEE John von Neumann Medal
- Grace Murray Hopper Award
- History of computing
  - History of computing hardware
  - History of computing hardware (1960s–present)
  - History of software
- List of computer science awards
- List of computer science journals
- List of computer scientists
- List of Internet pioneers
- List of people considered father or mother of a field § Computing
- The Man Who Invented the Computer (2010 book)
- List of Russian IT developers
- List of Women in Technology International Hall of Fame inductees
- Timeline of computing
- Turing Award
- Women in computing
