= Norwegian Computing Center =

Norwegian research foundation

Coordinates: 59°56′37.19″N 10°43′2.75″E

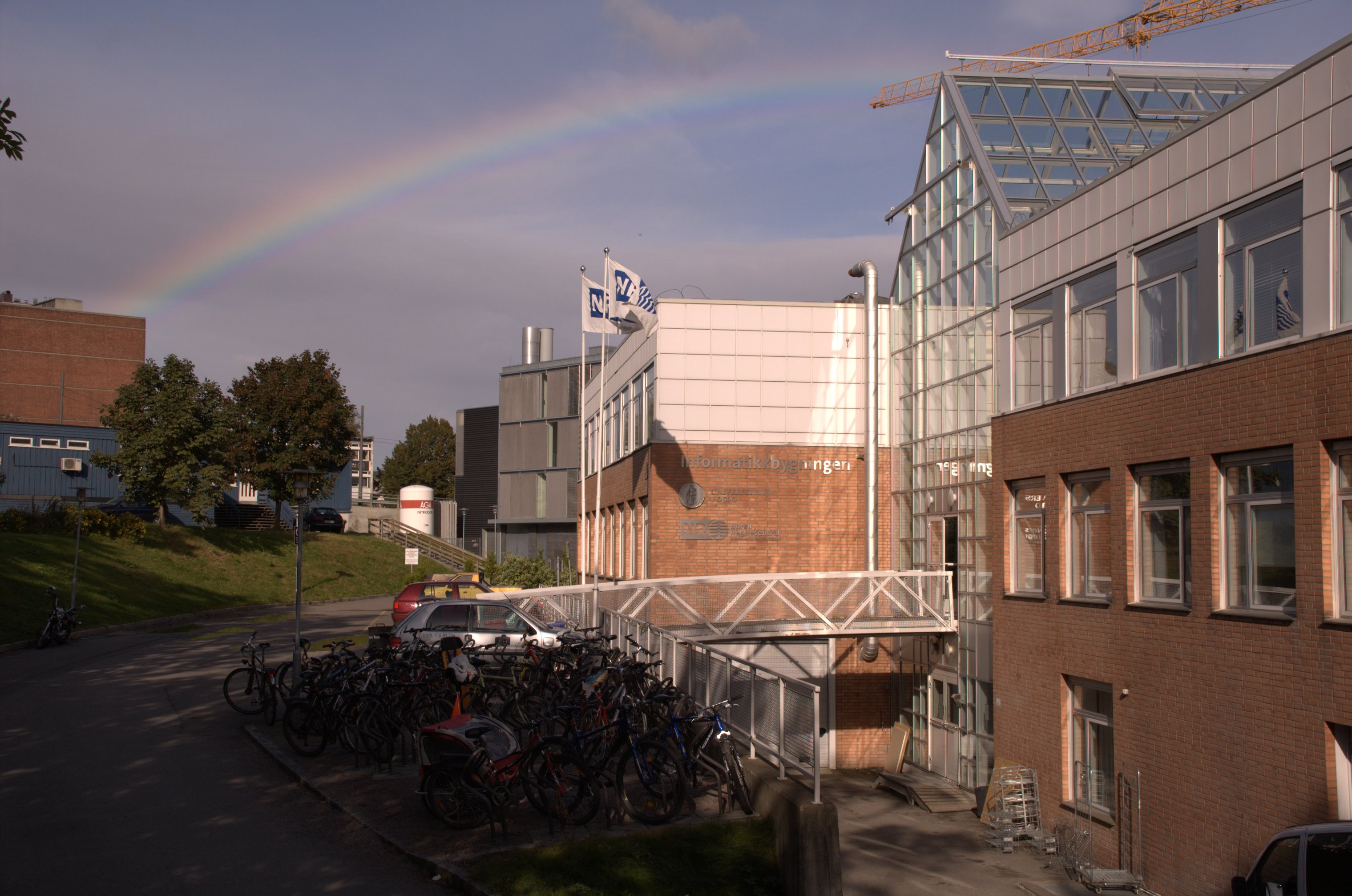
Kristen Nygaards hus, where Norsk Regnesentral is located with the Department of Informatics, University of Oslo.

Norwegian Computing Center (NR, in Norwegian: Norsk Regnesentral) is a private, independent, non-profit research foundation. NR carries out contract research and development in the areas of computing and quantitative methods for a broad range of industrial, commercial and public service organizations in Norway and internationally. NR is one of Europe's largest research environments in applied statistics and its projects cover a large variety of applied and academic problems. NR's offices are located near the university campus Blindern in Oslo, and adjacent to Oslo Science Park (Forskningsparken).

== History ==
NR was established in 1952. It was responsible for the operation and maintenance of NUSSE, Norway's first digital computer. Until 1970 an important part of the activity was to perform mathematical computations for other organizations. NR has worked with data communication since 1963. The Simula programming language was designed and built by Ole-Johan Dahl and Kristen Nygaard and their research group at the Norwegian Computing Center in Oslo between 1962 and 1967.

After 1970 NR has been a methodological research institute. In 1985, NR became an independent institute and moved to its present location in 1988. It has worked with the Internet since 1973, ICT security since 1988, multimedia since 1994, e-Inclusion since 2005. It started working with remote sensing in 1982, geostatistics and petroleum in 1983, marine resources in 1988 and electricity prices and finance in 1994.

NR employees Ole-Johan Dahl and Kristen Nygaard received the Turing Award in 2001 and the 2002 IEEE John von Neumann Medal for the introduction of the concepts underlying object-oriented programming through the design and implementation of Simula 67.

A book about the history of NR, Norsk Regnesentrals historie 1952 - 2002 was published in 2002.

== Scientific departments ==
The Department of Applied Research in Information Technology (DART) works with project-oriented applied research within multimedia, information security, information privacy and risks, universal design, and e-inclusion. In addition to research, DART's work covers concept studies, analysis, consultancy, prototyping, training, development, and evaluation.

The Department of Statistical Analysis, Image Analysis, and Pattern Recognition (SAMBA) works with project-oriented applied research in all areas of mathematical statistics. The main application areas are Statistics for Climate, Environment, Marine Resources and Health, Statistics for Finance, Insurance and Commodity Markets, Statistics for Technology, Industry and Administration, Earth Observation, and Image Analysis and Pattern Recognition.

The Department of Statistical Analysis of Natural Resource Data (SAND) works with project-oriented applied research statistics related to the petroleum industry. The group is a significant international contributor to research and services within reservoir description, stochastic modeling and geostatistics for the petroleum industry. The primary goal is to use statistical methods to reduce and quantify risk and uncertainty. The main area is stochastic modeling of the geology in petroleum reservoirs including upscaling and history matching. There is also a significant activity on all kinds of risk quantification, primarily within the energy sector.

== Centres for Research-based Innovation ==
NR was host to Statistics for Innovation in 2007-2014, and is host to BigInsight for the period 2015-2024.

Statistics for Innovation and BigInsight are both Centres for Research-based Innovation and funded by the Research Council of Norway.

== NR's Master's Prize ==
NR's Master’s Prize is awarded annually to master's theses submitted at the Department of Mathematics and the Department of Informatics at the University of Oslo and at the Department of Mathematical Sciences and the Department of Computer Science at the Norwegian University of Science and Technology. The award was first issued in 2009.

=== Previous winners ===
- 2024: Anders Søberg, UiO; Jostein Aastebøl Aanes, NTNU
- 2023: Jonas Eidesen, UiO; Jonas Paludan Reinholdt, UiO; Michael Gjertsen, NTNU
- 2022: Johannes Voll Kolstø, NTNU; Emil Haugen, UiO; Sarek Skotåm, UiO
- 2021: Magnus Christie Ørke, NTNU; Ingrid Dæhlen, UiO
- 2020: Maren Parnas Gulset, UiO; Simen Westby Moe, UiO; Amund Tenstad, NTNU; Henrik Syversveen-Lie, NTNU
- 2019: Camilla Lingjærde, UiO; Camilla Tran, NTNU; Silius Mortensønn Vandeskog, NTNU
- 2018: Bjørn Skauli, UiO; Joakim Skjelbred Misund, UiO; Yngvild Hamre, NTNU; Ulrich Johan Isachsen, NTNU
- 2017: Martine Birketvedt Eklund, UiO; Seline Tomt, UiO; Jonas André Dalseth, NTNU; Erik Skrettingland, NTNU
- 2016: Solveig Engebretsen, UiO; Aslak Wigdahl Bergersen, UiO; Bart Iver van Blokland, NTNU; Sondre Galtung, NTNU
- 2015: Claus Børnich, UiO; Jonas Irgens Kylling, UiO; Benjamin Andreassen Bjørnseth, NTNU
- 2014: Lars Simon, UiO; Kristoffer Varholm, NTNU
- 2013: Martin Jullum, UiO; Stein-Olav Hagen Davidsen, NTNU
- 2012: Kristina Rognlien Dahl, UiO; Eivind Stordal, UiO; Anne-Cecilie Haugstvedt, NTNU
- 2011: Kristian Jonsson Moi, UiO; Geir-Arne Fuglstad, NTNU
- 2010: Maren Feragen, UiO; Nina Øystad-Larsen; UiO, Lester Solbakken, NTNU
- 2009: John Christian Ottem, UiO; Evgenij Thorstensen, UiO; Eivind Fonn, NTNU; Rune E. Jensen, NTNU
