= Neumann Medal =

Neumann Medal may refer to

- IEEE John von Neumann Medal of the IEEE for outstanding achievements in computer-related science and technology.
- Neumann Medal of the Mineralogical Society of Great Britain and Ireland, for scientific excellence in mineralogy and its applications.
