= Pål Spilling =

Norwegian computer scientist

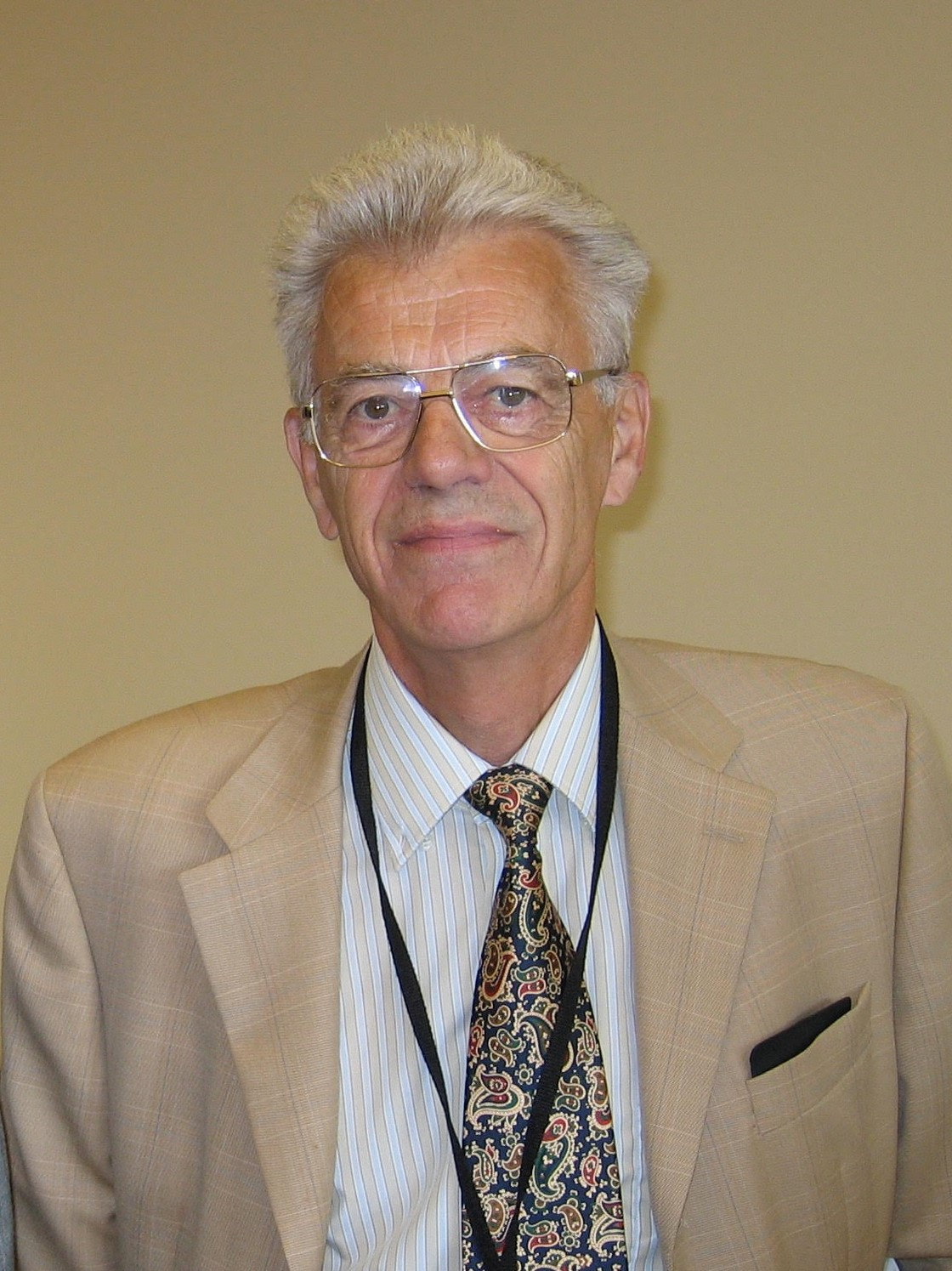
- Pål Spilling in 2007.
- Born: 29 October 1934
- Died: 16 January 2018 (aged 83)
- Known for: role in the development of the Internet

Academic background
- Education: University of Oslo; Utrecht University

Academic work
- Discipline: computer science physics
- Institutions: University of Oslo

Pål Spilling (29 October 1934 – 16 January 2018) was a Norwegian Internet pioneer and professor at the University of Oslo and the UNIK Graduate Center at Kjeller in Norway.

== Biography ==
He obtained his cand.real. degree in physics from the University of Oslo in 1963. In January 1964, he started on a PhD program at Utrecht University in The Netherlands, and finished his degree in summer 1968 in experimental low-energy neutron physics. Subsequently he joined the nuclear physics group at Eindhoven University of Technology in The Netherlands.

In January 1972, Spilling joined the Norwegian Defence Research Establishment (NDRE) at Kjeller in Norway, and in 1974 started working on computer networks under the leadership of Yngvar Lundh at NDRE in collaboration with the DARPA-funded research program on packet switching and Internet technology in the US.

The first ARPANET node outside the US was established at Kjeller, Norway in June 1973 for the NDRE researchers, and by the end of July 1973, an ARPANET node was also set up in the U.K. at the University College London.

Spilling visited Professor Peter Kirstein's research group at UCL in 1974 (other sources, including Pål Spillings own, say that this was in 1975) and worked with Vint Cerf, then junior assistant professor at Stanford University, on the then proposed Transmission Control Protocol conducting the first TCP tests between different implementations. Peter Kirstein writes:

One of the most significant activities at the time, seen from the 25 years on, were the early protocol experiments in late 1974 between a junior Assistant Professor at Stanford (Vint Cerf), and a visiting scholar from Norway at UCL (Paal Spilling) of the proposed Transmission Control Protocol. This international experiment, was the first test anywhere of the protocol suite now called the "Internet suite", which has made possible the current development of the Internet.

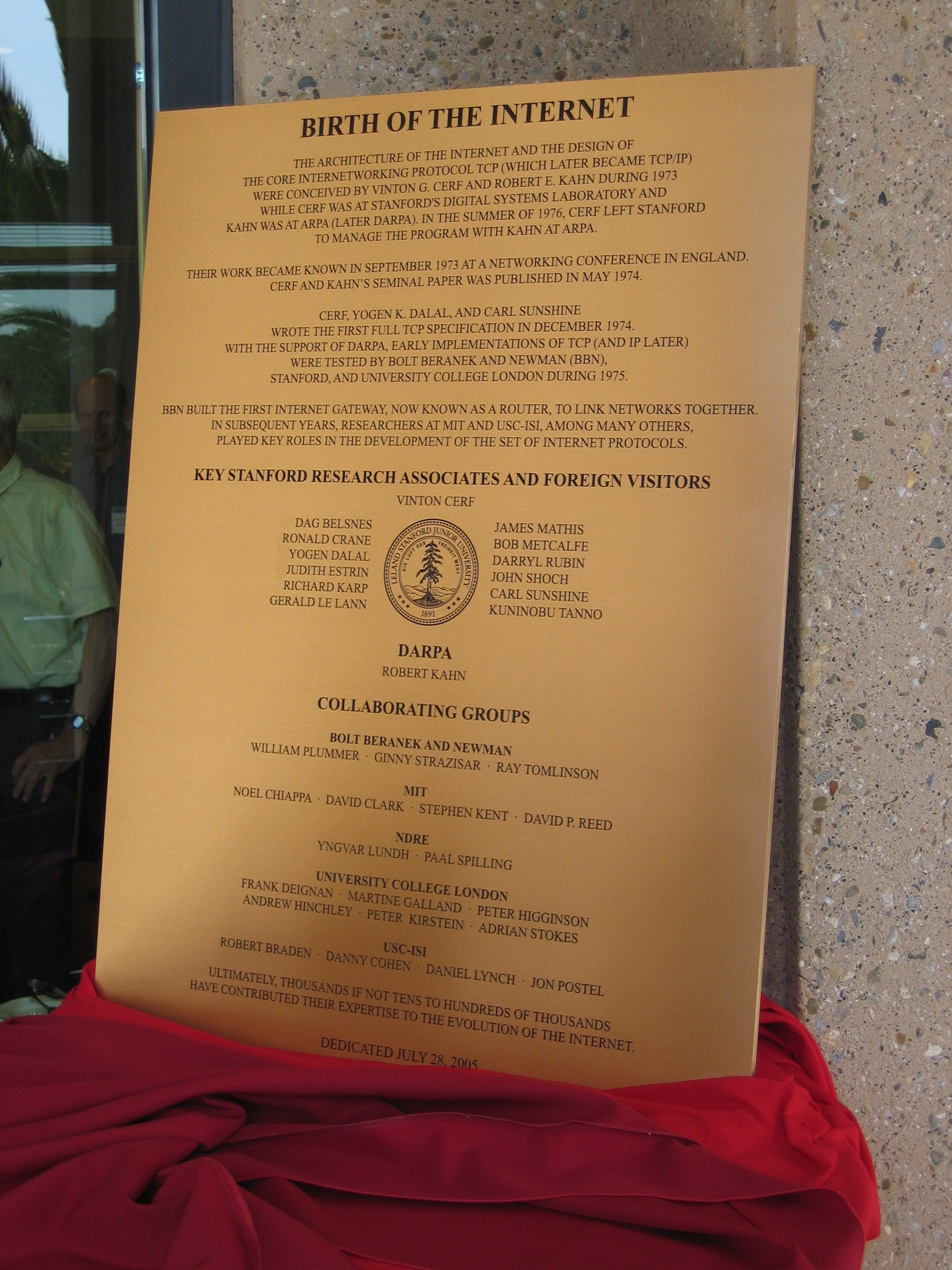
Birth of Internet plaque at Stanford University ceremony 28 July 2005

During the next few years Spilling also participated in the development of the Internet Protocol and other early computer network protocols. He was visiting scientist at SRI International at Stanford University in 1979/80, where he worked on the Packet Radio program.

Spilling left NDRE in August 1982 to join the former Research Department of the Norwegian Telecommunications Administration (NTA-RD), also at Kjeller. The NDRE ARPANET node followed Spilling to NTA-RD, and became a dooropener to packet switching and real time international communications for Norwegian research and academic communities. At NTA-RD Spilling also worked on communications security and the combination of Internet technology and fiber-optic transmission networks.

In 1988, ARPANET saw its first widespread infection by self-replicating code: Morris, a worm that could install multiple copies of itself on the same computer, causing infected systems to grind to a halt. As the Morris worm began to spread in the United States, Spilling's American colleagues called to warn him. Faced with a threat to his nation's entire network of computers, he acted quickly and disconnected Norway from the rest of the Internet, which at the time could be done by unplugging a single cable.

In 1993 Spilling became professor at Department of informatics, University of Oslo and UNIK, the University Graduate Center at Kjeller. Pål Spilling was internationally recognised for his role in the development of the Internet. His name is engraved in a bronze plaque roll of honour of Internet pioneers at Stanford University.

Spilling was also a local politician for the Conservative Party in Gjerdrum.

In 2021, Spilling was posthumously inducted to the Internet Hall of Fame.
