= Oslo Science Park =

Science park in Oslo, Norway

Coordinates: 59°56′31″N 10°43′00″E

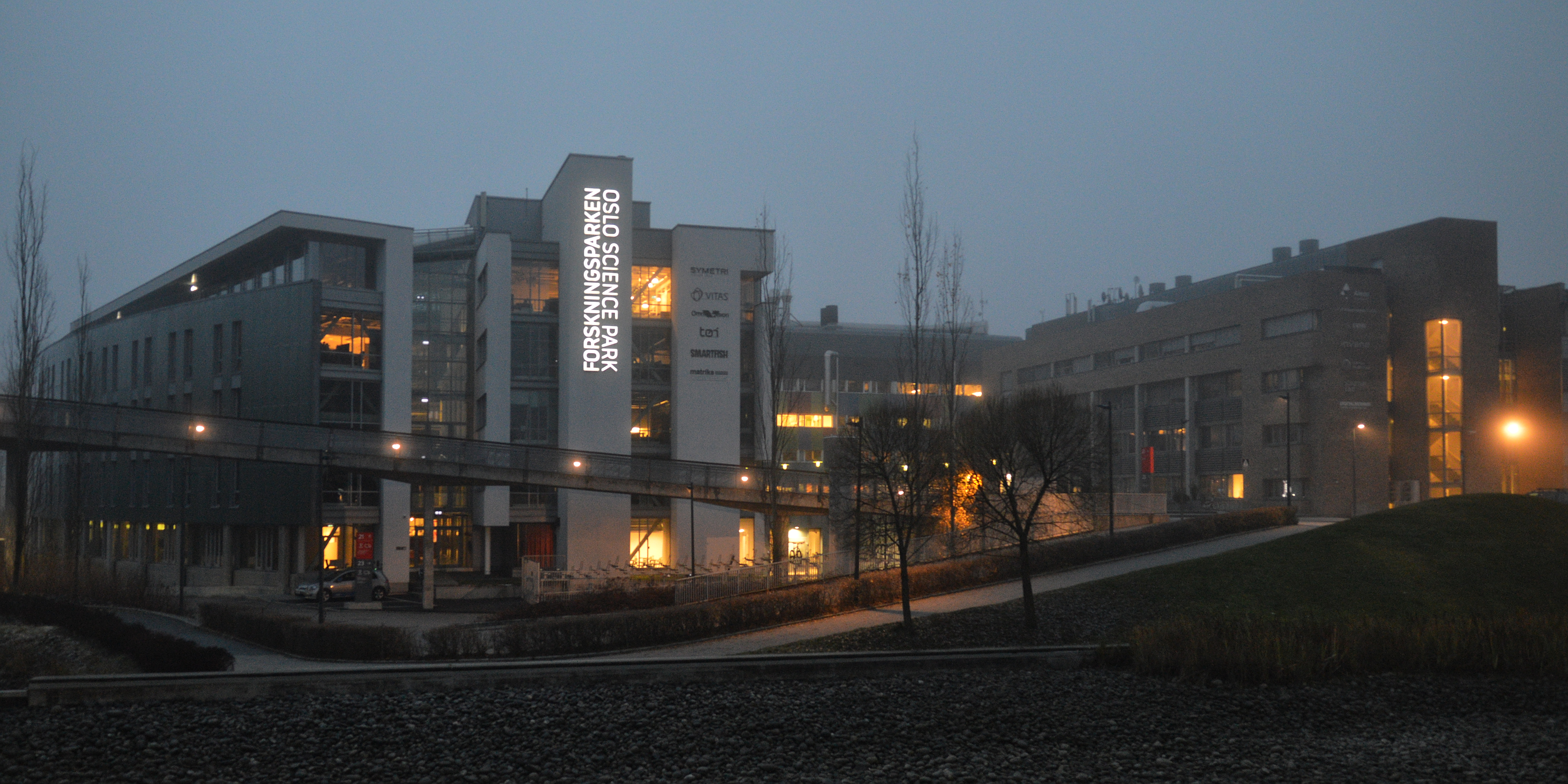
Oslo Science Park

Oslo Science Park (Forskningsparken i Oslo) is a science park located in Oslo, Norway. It is operated by Oslotech; its two main shareholders are the University of Oslo and Industrial Development Corporation of Norway (Siva). Its smaller shareholders include a large number of public institutions and private companies.

It is home to more than 140 companies, research groups and institutes that’s works with research and development within the fields of biotechnology and chemistry, medicine, information technology, media, materials science, electronics and environment- and society.

The complex has 5 buildings that houses more than 2000 people. In addition SINTEF and Department of Informatics, University of Oslo also have buildings located close by, but thus are not considered part of Oslo Innovation Center.

Together with their partner Kistefos Oslo Innovation Center also manages a venture fund Springfondet, that can make early stage investments in companies that are located at their incubator.
