= Ramón Verea =

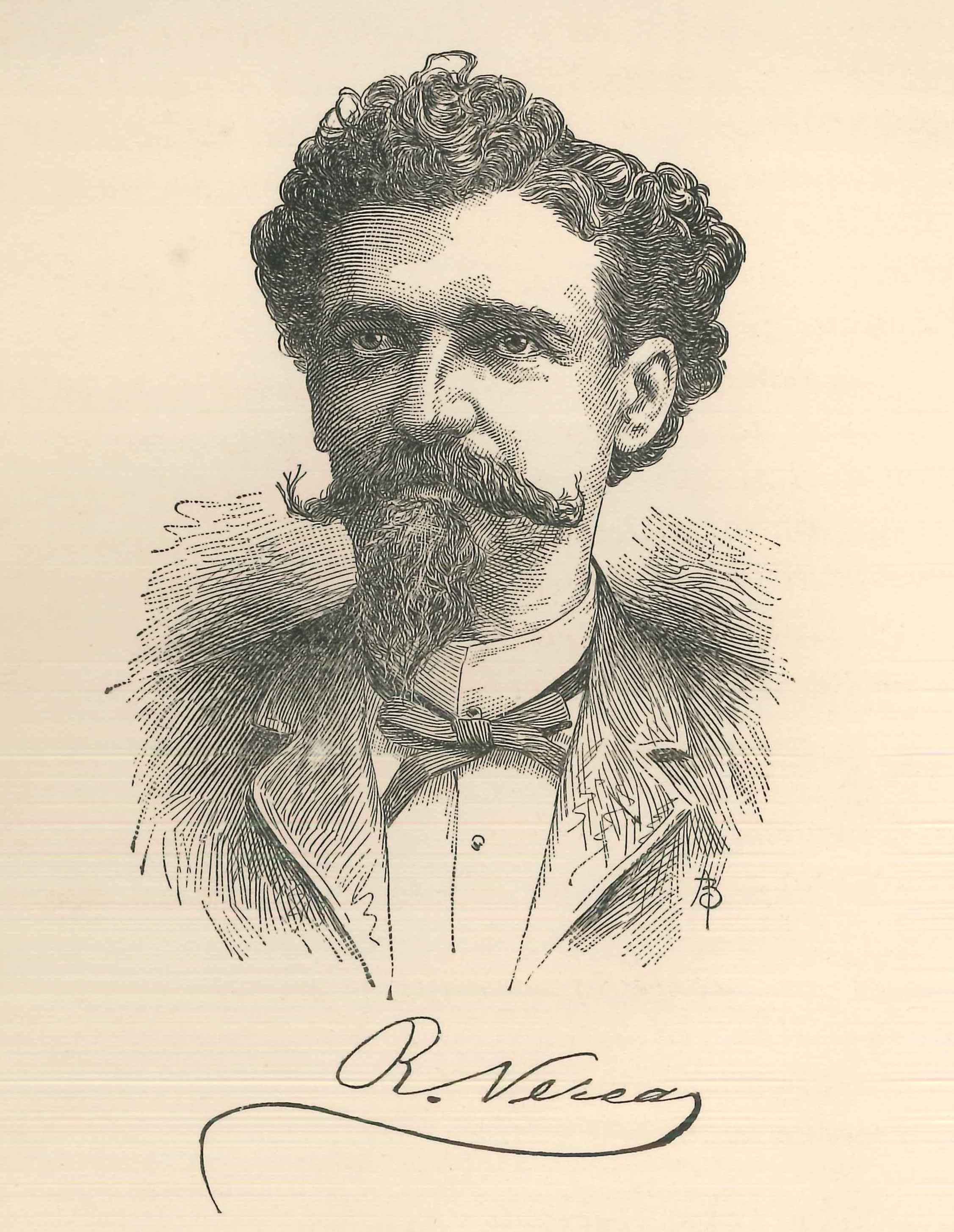
- Born: December 11, 1833; Curantes, Galicia, Spain
- Died: February 6, 1899 (aged 65); Buenos Aires, Argentina
- Resting place: La Chacarita Cemetery
- Occupations: Journalist, inventor, writer, engineer

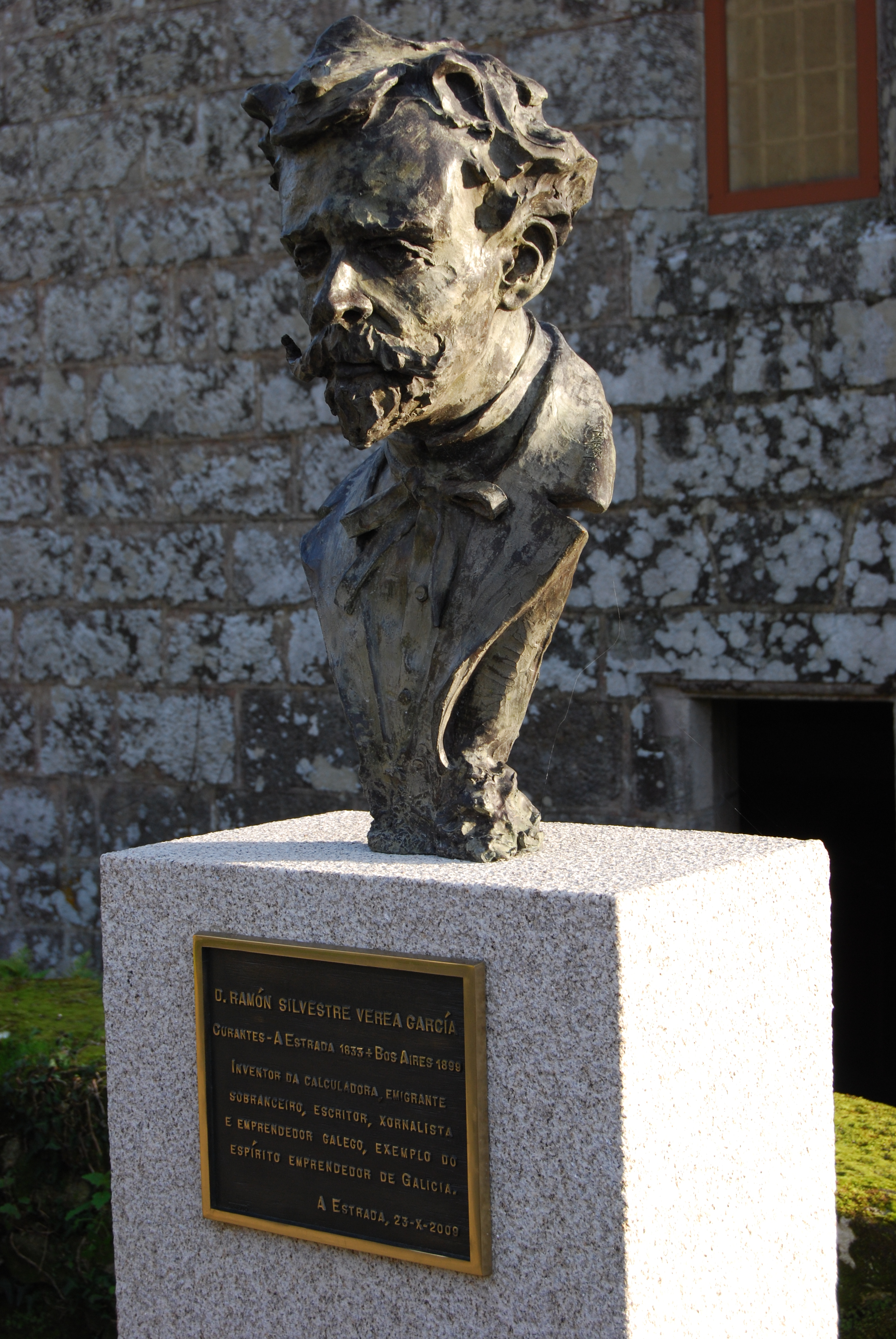
Bust of Ramón Verea at A Estrada.

Ramón Silvestre Verea Aguiar y García (Curantes, 11 December 1833 – Buenos Aires, 6 February 1899) was a Galician journalist, engineer and writer, known as the inventor of a Calculadora Alicia with an internal multiplication table (1878).

== Works ==
=== Novels ===
- La cruz de Cobblestone.
- Una mujer con dos maridos.

=== Essays ===
- Artículos filosóficos y cartas dirigidas a un campesino. Los Ángeles: "La Aurora", Librería Mexicana, [1909].

La religión universal: ensayos, comentarios y debates publicados en El Progreso durante 1886–87. Dios y la creación (manuscrito inédito). Nueva York: Tipografía El Polígloto, 1891.

- Catecismo librepensador, ó Cartas a un campesino... Nueva York: Imprenta "El polígloto", 1894 y Managua, Tipografía nacional, 1894; reimpreso con otro título: Catecismo libre-pensador. Cartas a un campesino. San Salvador: Imp. R. Reyes [1923]
- En defensa de España, cuestiones de Cuba, Venezuela, "América para los Americanos"... Guatemala: Sánchez y de Guise, 1896.

== See also ==
- List of pioneers in computer science

== Notes ==
- Biography of Ramón Verea
- Calculating machine of Ramón Verea
- Reportaje sobre él en El País, 4 de agosto de 2013
- Un gallego inventó la calculadora, artículo aparecido en La Voz de Galicia el 30 de diciembre de 2004.
- Imagen de la máquina de calcular de Verea
- Ramon Verea's Internal Multiplication Table
