= Turing Award =

American annual computer science prize

ACM Turing Award
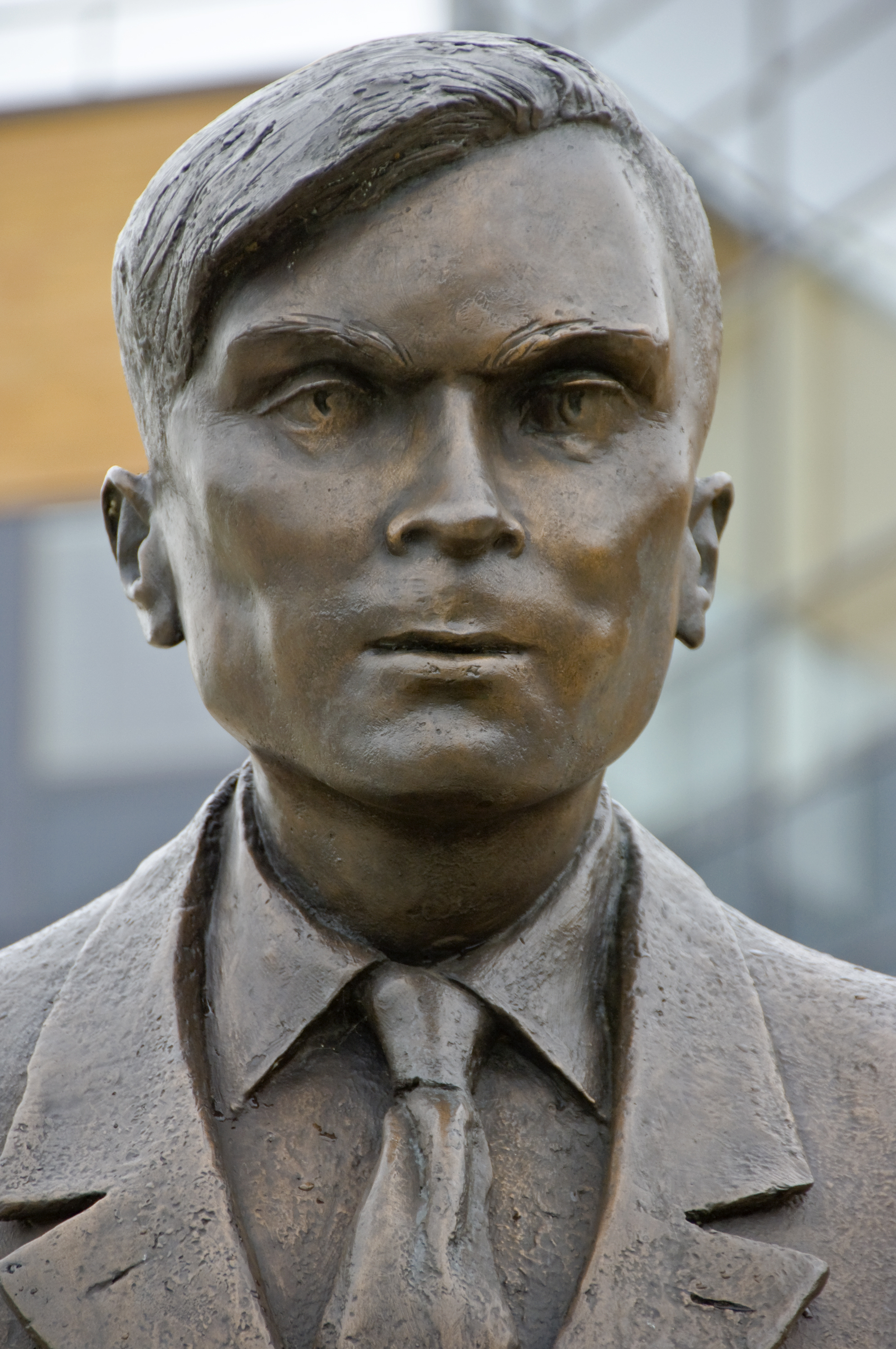
- Statue of Alan Turing
- Awarded for: Outstanding contributions in computer science
- Country: United States
- Presented by: Association for Computing Machinery
- Reward: US$1,000,000
- First award: 1966; 60 years ago
- Website: amturing.acm.org

The ACM A. M. Turing Award is an annual prize given by the Association for Computing Machinery (ACM) for contributions of lasting and major technical importance to computer science. It is generally recognized as the highest distinction in the field of computer science and is often referred to as the "Nobel Prize of Computing". As of 2026, 81 people have been awarded the prize, with the most recent recipients being Charles H. Bennett and Gilles Brassard, who won in 2025.

The award is named after Alan Turing, also referred as "Father of Computer Science", who was a British mathematician and reader in mathematics at the University of Manchester. Turing is often credited as being the founder of theoretical computer science and artificial intelligence, and a key contributor to the Allied cryptanalysis of the Enigma cipher during World War II. From 2007 to 2013, the award was accompanied by a prize of US$250,000, with financial support provided by Intel and Google. Since 2014, the award has been accompanied by a prize of US$1 million, with financial support provided by Google.

The Turing Award of 1983, given to Dennis Ritchie and Ken Thompson, on display at Nokia Bell Labs.

The first recipient, in 1966, was Alan Perlis. The youngest recipient was Donald Knuth, who won in 1974 at the age of 36, while the oldest recipient was Alfred Aho, who won in 2020 at the age of 79. Three women have been awarded the prize: Frances Allen (in 2006), Barbara Liskov (in 2008), and Shafi Goldwasser (in 2012).

== Recipients ==
Recipients of the ACM Turing award
Year	Recipient(s)		Citation	Affiliation (Note: At time of award)
1966		Alan Perlis	"for his influence in the area of advanced computer programming techniques and compiler construction"	Carnegie Mellon University
1967	Maurice Wilkes	Maurice Wilkes	for contributions including being "the builder and designer of the EDSAC, the second computer with an internally stored program" and introducing program libraries (together with David Wheeler and Stanley Gill)	University of Cambridge
1968		Richard Hamming	"for his work on numerical methods, automatic coding systems, and error-detecting and error-correcting codes"	Bell Labs
1969	Marvin Minsky	Marvin Minsky	"for his central role in creating, shaping, promoting, and advancing the field of artificial intelligence"	Massachusetts Institute of Technology
1970		James H. Wilkinson	"for his research in numerical analysis to facilitate the use of the high-speed digital computer, having received special recognition for his work in computations in linear algebra and 'backward' error analysis"	National Physical Laboratory
1971	John McCarthy	John McCarthy	Award citation refers to McCarthy's lecture "The Present State of Research on Artificial Intelligence"	Stanford University
1972	Edsger W. Dijkstra	Edsger W. Dijkstra	"for fundamental contributions to programming as a high, intellectual challenge; for eloquent insistence and practical demonstration that programs should be composed correctly, not just debugged into correctness; for illuminating perception of problems at the foundations of program design"	Eindhoven University of Technology
1973	Charles Bachman	Charles Bachman	"for his outstanding contributions to database technology"	General Electric Research Laboratory (now under Groupe Bull, an Atos company)
1974	Donald Knuth	Donald Knuth	"for his major contributions to the analysis of algorithms and the design of programming languages, and in particular for his contributions to 'The Art of Computer Programming' through his well-known books in a continuous series by this title"	Stanford University
1975		Allen Newell	in collaboration with J. C. Shaw and others, for "basic contributions to artificial intelligence, the psychology of human cognition, and list processing."	RAND Corporation
1975	Herbert A. Simon	Herbert A. Simon	in collaboration with J. C. Shaw and others, for "basic contributions to artificial intelligence, the psychology of human cognition, and list processing."	Carnegie Mellon University
1976	Michael O. Rabin	Michael O. Rabin	"for their joint paper 'Finite automata and their decision problem', which introduced the idea of nondeterministic machines"	Princeton University
1976	Dana Scott	Dana Scott	"for their joint paper 'Finite automata and their decision problem', which introduced the idea of nondeterministic machines"	University of Chicago
1977	John Backus	John Backus	"for profound, influential, and lasting contributions to the design of practical high-level programming systems, notably through his work on FORTRAN, and for seminal publication of formal procedures for the specification of programming languages"	IBM Research
1978		Robert W. Floyd	"for having a clear influence on methodologies for the creation of efficient and reliable software, and for helping to found the following important subfields of computer science: the theory of parsing, the semantics of programming languages, automatic program verification, automatic program synthesis, and analysis of algorithms"	Stanford University
1979		Kenneth E. Iverson	"for his pioneering effort in programming languages and mathematical notation resulting in what the computing field now knows as APL, for his contributions to the implementation of interactive systems, to educational uses of APL, and to programming language theory and practice"	IBM Research
1980	Tony Hoare	Tony Hoare	"for his fundamental contributions to the definition and design of programming languages"	University of Oxford
1981		Edgar F. Codd	"for his fundamental and continuing contributions to the theory and practice of database management systems"	IBM Research
1982	Stephen Cook	Stephen Cook	for "his advancement of our understanding of the complexity of computation in a significant and profound way"; the citation in particular mentions his paper "The Complexity of Theorem Proving Procedures," which is credited with founding the theory of NP-completeness	University of Toronto
1983	Dennis Ritchie	Dennis Ritchie	"for their development of generic operating systems theory and specifically for the implementation of the UNIX operating system"	Bell Labs
1983	Ken Thompson	Ken Thompson	"for their development of generic operating systems theory and specifically for the implementation of the UNIX operating system"	Bell Labs
1984	Niklaus Wirth	Niklaus Wirth	"for developing a sequence of innovative computer languages, EULER, ALGOL-W, MODULA and PASCAL"	ETH Zurich
1985	Richard M. Karp	Richard M. Karp	"for his continuing contributions to the theory of algorithms including the development of efficient algorithms for network flow and other combinatorial optimization problems, the identification of polynomial-time computability with the intuitive notion of algorithmic efficiency, and, most notably, contributions to the theory of NP-completeness"	University of California, Berkeley
1986	John Hopcroft	John Hopcroft	"for fundamental achievements in the design and analysis of algorithms and data structures"	Cornell University
1986	Robert Tarjan	Robert Tarjan	"for fundamental achievements in the design and analysis of algorithms and data structures"	Bell Labs, Princeton University
1987		John Cocke	"for significant contributions in the design and theory of compilers, the architecture of large systems and the development of reduced instruction set computers (RISC); for discovering and systematizing many fundamental transformations now used in optimizing compilers including reduction of operator strength, elimination of common subexpressions, register allocation, constant propagation, and dead code elimination"	IBM Research
1988	Ivan Sutherland	Ivan Sutherland	"for his pioneering and visionary contributions to computer graphics, starting with Sketchpad, and continuing after"	Sun Microsystems
1989	William Kahan	William Kahan	"for his fundamental contributions to numerical analysis" and as "one of the foremost experts on floating-point computations"	University of California, Berkeley
1990	Fernando J. Corbató	Fernando J. Corbató	"for his pioneering work organizing the concepts and leading the development of the general-purpose, large-scale, time-sharing and resource-sharing computer systems, CTSS and Multics"	Massachusetts Institute of Technology
1991		Robin Milner	The award citation mentions three primary contributions: his mechanization of the Logic of Computable Functions; the programming language ML including its type inference and type safety; the calculus of communicating systems; as well as the connection between operational and denotational semantics	University of Edinburgh
1992	Butler Lampson	Butler Lampson	"for contributions to the development of distributed, personal computing environments and the technology for their implementation: workstations, networks, operating systems, programming systems, displays, security and document publishing"	Digital Equipment Corporation
1993	Juris Hartmanis	Juris Hartmanis	"in recognition of their seminal paper which established the foundations for the field of computational complexity theory"	General Electric Research Laboratory (now under Groupe Bull, an Atos company)
1993	Richard E. Stearns	Richard E. Stearns	"in recognition of their seminal paper which established the foundations for the field of computational complexity theory"	General Electric Research Laboratory (now under Groupe Bull, an Atos company)
1994	Edward A. Feigenbaum	Edward Feigenbaum	"for pioneering the design and construction of large scale artificial intelligence systems, demonstrating the practical importance and potential commercial impact of artificial intelligence technology"	Stanford University
1994	Raj Reddy	Raj Reddy	"for pioneering the design and construction of large scale artificial intelligence systems, demonstrating the practical importance and potential commercial impact of artificial intelligence technology"	Carnegie Mellon University
1995	Manuel Blum	Manuel Blum	"in recognition of his contributions to the foundations of computational complexity theory and its application to cryptography and program checking"	University of California, Berkeley
1996	Amir Pnueli	Amir Pnueli	"for seminal work introducing temporal logic into computing science and for outstanding contributions to program and system verification"	Weizmann Institute of Science
1997	Douglas Engelbart	Douglas Engelbart	"for an inspiring vision of the future of interactive computing and the invention of key technologies to help realize this vision"	Bootstrap Institute/Alliance,
1998	Jim Gray	Jim Gray	"for seminal contributions to database and transaction processing research and technical leadership in system implementation"	Microsoft Research
1999	Fred Brooks	Fred Brooks	"for landmark contributions to computer architecture, operating systems, and software engineering"	IBM Research, University of North Carolina at Chapel Hill
2000	Andrew Yao	Andrew Yao	"in recognition of his fundamental contributions to the theory of computation, including the complexity-based theory of pseudorandom number generation, cryptography, and communication complexity"	Princeton University
2001		Ole-Johan Dahl	"for ideas fundamental to the emergence of object-oriented programming, through their design of the programming languages Simula I and Simula 67"	Norwegian Computing Center, University of Oslo
2001	Kristen Nygaard	Kristen Nygaard	"for ideas fundamental to the emergence of object-oriented programming, through their design of the programming languages Simula I and Simula 67"	Norwegian Computing Center, University of Oslo
2002	Leonard Adleman	Leonard Adleman	"for their ingenious contribution for making public-key cryptography useful in practice"	University of Southern California
2002	Ron Rivest	Ron Rivest	"for their ingenious contribution for making public-key cryptography useful in practice"	Massachusetts Institute of Technology
2002	Adi Shamir	Adi Shamir	"for their ingenious contribution for making public-key cryptography useful in practice"	Massachusetts Institute of Technology
2003	Alan Kay	Alan Kay	"for pioneering many of the ideas at the root of contemporary object-oriented programming languages, leading the team that developed Smalltalk, and for fundamental contributions to personal computing"	HP Labs
2004	Vint Cerf	Vint Cerf	"for pioneering work on internetworking, including the design and implementation of the Internet's basic communications protocols, TCP/IP, and for inspired leadership in networking"	MCI, CNRI
2004	Bob Kahn	Robert Kahn	"for pioneering work on internetworking, including the design and implementation of the Internet's basic communications protocols, TCP/IP, and for inspired leadership in networking"	CNRI
2005	Peter Naur	Peter Naur	"for fundamental contributions to programming language design and the definition of ALGOL 60, to compiler design, and to the art and practice of computer programming"	University of Copenhagen
2006	Frances Allen	Frances Allen	"for pioneering contributions to the theory and practice of optimizing compiler techniques that laid the foundation for modern optimizing compilers and automatic parallel execution"	IBM Research
2007	Edmund M. Clarke	Edmund M. Clarke	"for their role in developing model checking into a highly effective verification technology that is widely adopted in the hardware and software industries"	Carnegie Mellon University
2007	E. Allen Emerson	E. Allen Emerson	"for their role in developing model checking into a highly effective verification technology that is widely adopted in the hardware and software industries"	University of Texas at Austin
2007	Joseph Sifakis	Joseph Sifakis	"for their role in developing model checking into a highly effective verification technology that is widely adopted in the hardware and software industries"	French National Centre for Scientific Research
2008	Barbara Liskov	Barbara Liskov	"for contributions to practical and theoretical foundations of programming language and system design, especially related to data abstraction, fault tolerance, and distributed computing"	Massachusetts Institute of Technology
2009	Charles P. Thacker	Charles P. Thacker	"for the pioneering design and realization of the first modern personal computer—the Alto at Xerox PARC—and seminal inventions and contributions to local area networks (including the Ethernet), multiprocessor workstations, snooping cache coherence protocols, and tablet personal computers"	Microsoft Research
2010	Leslie Valiant	Leslie Valiant	"for transformative contributions to the theory of computation, including the theory of probably approximately correct (PAC) learning, the complexity of enumeration and of algebraic computation, and the theory of parallel and distributed computing"	Harvard University
2011	Judea Pearl	Judea Pearl	"for fundamental contributions to artificial intelligence through the development of a calculus for probabilistic and causal reasoning"	University of California, Los Angeles
2012	Shafi Goldwasser	Shafi Goldwasser	"for transformative work that laid the complexity-theoretic foundations for the science of cryptography, and in the process pioneered new methods for efficient verification of mathematical proofs in complexity theory"	Massachusetts Institute of Technology, Weizmann Institute of Science
2012	Silvio Micali	Silvio Micali	"for transformative work that laid the complexity-theoretic foundations for the science of cryptography, and in the process pioneered new methods for efficient verification of mathematical proofs in complexity theory"	Massachusetts Institute of Technology
2013	Leslie Lamport	Leslie Lamport	"for fundamental contributions to the theory and practice of distributed and concurrent systems, notably the invention of concepts such as causality and logical clocks, safety and liveness, replicated state machines, and sequential consistency"	Microsoft Research
2014	Michael Stonebraker	Michael Stonebraker	"for fundamental contributions to the concepts and practices underlying modern database systems"	Massachusetts Institute of Technology
2015	Whitfield Diffie	Whitfield Diffie	"for inventing and promulgating both asymmetric public-key cryptography, including its application to digital signatures, and a practical cryptographic key-exchange method	Stanford University
2015	Martin Hellman	Martin Hellman	"for inventing and promulgating both asymmetric public-key cryptography, including its application to digital signatures, and a practical cryptographic key-exchange method	Stanford University
2016	Tim Berners-Lee	Tim Berners-Lee	"for inventing the World Wide Web, the first web browser, and the fundamental protocols and algorithms allowing the Web to scale"	Massachusetts Institute of Technology, World Wide Web Consortium
2017	John L. Hennessy	John L. Hennessy	"for pioneering a systematic, quantitative approach to the design and evaluation of computer architectures with enduring impact on the microprocessor industry"	Stanford University
2017	David Patterson	David Patterson	"for pioneering a systematic, quantitative approach to the design and evaluation of computer architectures with enduring impact on the microprocessor industry"	University of California, Berkeley
2018	Yoshua Bengio	Yoshua Bengio	"for conceptual and engineering breakthroughs that have made deep neural networks a critical component of computing"	Université de Montréal, Mila
2018	Geoffrey Hinton	Geoffrey Hinton	"for conceptual and engineering breakthroughs that have made deep neural networks a critical component of computing"	University of Toronto, Google Brain
2018	Yann LeCun	Yann LeCun	"for conceptual and engineering breakthroughs that have made deep neural networks a critical component of computing"	New York University, Meta AI
2019	Edwin Catmull	Edwin Catmull	"For fundamental contributions to 3D computer graphics, and the impact of computer-generated imagery (CGI) in filmmaking and other applications"	Pixar
2019	Pat Hanrahan	Pat Hanrahan	"For fundamental contributions to 3D computer graphics, and the impact of computer-generated imagery (CGI) in filmmaking and other applications"	Stanford University
2020		Alfred Aho	"for fundamental algorithms and theory underlying programming language implementation and for synthesizing these results and those of others in their highly influential books, which educated generations of computer scientists"	Columbia University
2020		Jeffrey Ullman	"for fundamental algorithms and theory underlying programming language implementation and for synthesizing these results and those of others in their highly influential books, which educated generations of computer scientists"	Stanford University
2021	Jack Dongarra	Jack Dongarra	"for pioneering contributions to numerical algorithms and libraries that enabled high performance computational software to keep pace with exponential hardware improvements for over four decades"	Oak Ridge National Laboratory, University of Manchester, University of Tennessee, Rice University
2022	Robert Metcalfe	Robert Metcalfe	"for the invention, standardization, and commercialization of Ethernet"	Massachusetts Institute of Technology
2023	Avi Wigderson	Avi Wigderson	"For foundational contributions to the theory of computation, including reshaping our understanding of the role of randomness in computation and mathematics, and for his decades of intellectual leadership in theoretical computer science"	Institute for Advanced Study
2024		Andrew Barto	"For developing the conceptual and algorithmic foundations of reinforcement learning"	University of Massachusetts Amherst
2024	Richard S. Sutton	Richard S. Sutton	"For developing the conceptual and algorithmic foundations of reinforcement learning"	University of Alberta, Amii
2025	Charles H. Bennett	Charles H. Bennett	"For their essential role in igniting and shaping the quantum revolution in computer science and in information and communications technology."	IBM Research
2025	Gilles Brassard	Gilles Brassard	"For their essential role in igniting and shaping the quantum revolution in computer science and in information and communications technology."	Université de Montréal

== See also ==
- Fields Medal
- ACM Prize in Computing
- IEEE John von Neumann Medal
- List of awards named after people
- List of computer science awards
- List of computer-related awards
- List of pioneers in computer science
- List of ACM Awards
- List of prizes known as the Nobel or the highest honors of a field
