= Saul Rosen =

American computer scientist

- Born: February 8, 1922; Port Chester, New York
- Died: June 9, 1991 (aged 69); West Lafayette, Indiana
- Education: University of Pennsylvania
- Awards: ACM Distinguished Service Award 1984
- Scientific career
- Thesis: Modular Transformations of Certain Series (1950)
- Doctoral advisor: Hans Adolph Rademacher

Saul Rosen (February 8, 1922 – June 9, 1991) was an American computer science pioneer. He is known for designing the software of the first transistor-based computer Philco Transac S-2000, and for his work on programming language design which influenced the ALGOL language.

In 1947, he was involved in establishing the Association for Computing Machinery; in particular he was the first editor of its journal Communications of the ACM. In 1979 he co-founded the journal Annals of the History of Computing, then published by AFIPS.

== Selected publications ==
- Saul Rosen (1953). "Modular transformation of certain series". Duke Mathematical Journal. 20 (4): 593–599. doi:10.1215/s0012-7094-53-02060-2.
- Saul Rosen (Jan 1967). Programming Systems and Languages. McGraw Hill Computer Science Series. New York/NY: McGraw Hill. ISBN 0070537089.
- Saul Rosen (Jul 1968). Electronic Computers —- A Historical Survey in Print (Computer Science Technical Report). Purdue University Department.
- Saul Rosen (1990). The Origins of Modern Computing (Computer Science Technical Report / Purdue e-Pubs). Purdue University.
- Saul Rosen (Sep 1990). "The Origins of Modern Computing". Computing Reviews. 31 (9): 449–481.
- Saul Rosen (Jun 1991). PHILCO: Some Recollections of the PHILCO TRANSAC S-2000 (Computer Science Technical Reports / Purdue e-Pubs). Purdue University.

== See also ==
- List of pioneers in computer science
