= Yngvar G. Lundh =

Norwegian engineer and technology pioneer

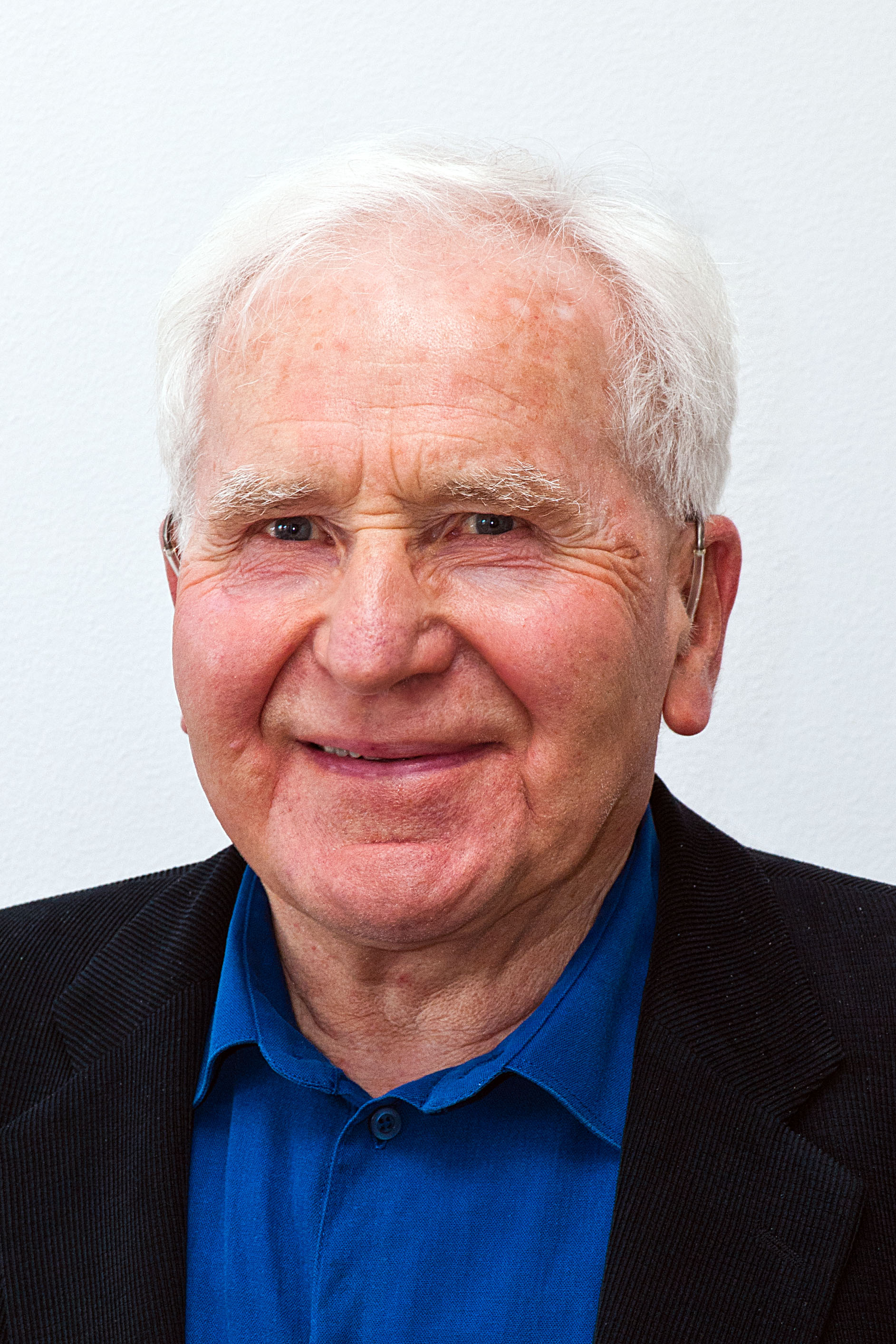
- 2012

Yngvar Gundro Lundh (19 March 1932 – 15 August 2020) was a Norwegian engineer and technology pioneer. He was known for bringing Internet to Norway as the second country after USA, and for developing one of Norway's first computing devices. In 2021 he was inducted in the Internet Hall of Fame.

== Life ==
=== Background ===
Lundh grew up near Tønsberg (1932–1938), in Son, Norway (1938–1949) and in Råde, as the firstborn son of a farmer. He graduated in low-voltage electronics at Norges tekniske høgskole (NTH) in Trondheim in 1956.

=== Career ===
Lundh worked as a scientist at Forsvarets forskningsinstitutt (FFI, 1957–1984) and was guest lecturer at Massachusetts Institute of Technology (1958) and Bell Labs (1970).

He was chief engineer in Televerket/Telenor 1985-1996 and ran a consulting service after that Vista Telematikk. He was professor II in informatics at UiO from 1980, where he began teaching microelectronics and computer networking.

He was a radio amateur with the callsign LA7ZC.
