= IEEE John von Neumann Medal =

IEEE award

- Awarded for: Outstanding achievements in computer-related science and technology
- First award: 1992
- Website: IEEE John von Neumann Medal

The IEEE John von Neumann Medal was established by the IEEE Board of Directors in 1990 and may be presented annually "for outstanding achievements in computer-related science and technology." The achievements may be theoretical, technological, or entrepreneurial, and need not have been made immediately prior to the date of the award.

The medal is named after John von Neumann.

== Recipients ==
The following people have received the IEEE John von Neumann Medal:

- 2026: Donald D. Chamberlin
- 2025: Miklós Ajtai
- 2024: Christopher D. Manning
- 2023: Tom Leighton
- 2022: Deborah Estrin
- 2021: Jeffrey Dean
- 2020: Michael I. Jordan
- 2019: Éva Tardos
- 2018: Patrick Cousot
- 2017: Vladimir Vapnik
- 2016: Christos Papadimitriou
- 2015: James A. Gosling
- 2014: Cleve Moler
- 2013: Jack Dennis
- 2012: Edward J. McCluskey
- 2011: C. A. R. Hoare
- 2010: John Hopcroft and Jeffrey Ullman
- 2009: Susan L. Graham
- 2008: Leslie Lamport
- 2007: Charles P. Thacker
- 2006: Edwin Catmull
- 2005: Michael Stonebraker
- 2004: Barbara H. Liskov
- 2003: Alfred V. Aho
- 2002: Ole-Johan Dahl and Kristen Nygaard
- 2001: Butler W. Lampson
- 2000: John L. Hennessy and David A. Patterson
- 1999: Douglas C. Engelbart
- 1998: Ivan Edward Sutherland
- 1997: Maurice V. Wilkes
- 1996: Carver A. Mead
- 1995: Donald E. Knuth
- 1994: John Cocke
- 1993: Frederick P. Brooks
- 1992: C. Gordon Bell

== See also ==
- List of computer science awards
- John von Neumann Theory Prize awarded by the Institute for Operations Research and the Management Sciences (INFORMS).
- Prizes named after people
