= Rosing Prize =

Rosing Prizes
- Description: Awards recognizing outstanding contributions to the Norwegian IT community
- Country: Norway
- Presented by: Norwegian Computer Society

The Rosing Prizes are awarded to people who have made contributions to the Norwegian IT community, it is the Norwegian Computer Society (Den Norske Dataforening) that organizes the award ceremony. The Norwegian Computer Society was established in 1953 in Oslo and has over 8500 members, making it one of the oldest computer societies in Europe. It is also a member of the International Federation for Information Processing, the Council of European Professional Informatics Societies (CEPSIS) and the Nordic Data Union (NDU).

== History and categories ==
The association awarded its first Rosing prize in 1991 and named it after the Norwegian IT-pioneer Fredrik Rosing Bull.

Rosing Prizes are distributed as part of the Norwegian IT industry's own party ceremony. The prizes are available in several different categories, but not all are awarded annually. In 2016, the computer society awarded prizes for such as the year's top manager, IT director, IT security award and an Rosing Honorary Award. Other prizes that have been awarded previously are the usability prize, the creativity prize, and smart IT.

Recipients of the award includes Jon Stephenson von Tetzchner, Trygve Reenskaug, Ole-Johan Dahl, Jon Bing and Kristen Nygaard.

The Rosing Prizes are awarded to people who have made contributions to the Norwegian IT community, it is the Norwegian Computer Society (Den Norske Dataforening) that organizes the award ceremony. The Norwegian Computer Society was established in 1953 in Oslo and has over 8500 members, making it one of the oldest computer societies in Europe. It is also a member of the International Federation for Information Processing, the Council of European Professional Informatics Societies (CEPSIS) and the Nordic Data Union (NDU).

The association awarded its first Rosing prize in 1991 and named it after the Norwegian IT-pioneer Fredrik Rosing Bull.

Rosing Prizes are distributed as part of the Norwegian IT industry's own party ceremony. The prizes are available in several different categories, but not all are awarded annually. In 2016, the computer society awarded prizes for such as the year's top manager, IT director, IT security award and an Rosing Honorary Award. Other prizes that have been awarded previously are the usability prize, the creativity prize, and smart IT.

Recipients of the award includes Jon Stephenson von Tetzchner, Trygve Reenskaug, Ole-Johan Dahl, Jon Bing and Kristen Nygaard.

== Categories ==
=== Rosing Honorary Prize ===
The Rosing honorary prize is awarded to individuals who in a meritorious and significant way have contributed to the development, selection and the embossing of Norwegian IT disciplines in the industry either nationally or internationally over a long period of time. The prize is only awarded in the years in which a worthy candidate has been found.

- 2016: Erik Fossum was awarded the prize for the creation of Altinn, a public web portal used to submit tax returns and other forms digitally.
- 2015: Trygve Reenskaug was awarded the prize for groundbreaking work in object-oriented design, such as formulating the MVC.
- 2014: For their contributions to the development of GSM and SMS, the following people are winners of the Rosing Honorary Prize 2014:
  - Torleiv Maseng from Sintef Elab for having made important contributions to the development of radio technology in GSM.
  - Odd Trandem from Sintef Elab as the problem and challenge solver in the development of the GSM standard
  - Finn Trosby from Televerkets Forskningsinstitutt (TF) who led the work of making the SMS service as we know it today.
  - Jan Audestad from TF for having led the network side of the GMS standard and put it together in a sensible architecture, as well as developed protocols for the GSM.
  - Stein Hansen from TF as a GSM pioneer and for its key contribution to the coordination and development of the GSM standard, in particular the UMTS version, voice coding and coordination of modem tests.
  - Jon Emil Natvig from TF for efforts in the development of digital voice coding (full-rate) for GSM.
- 2013: Q-Free
- 2012: Arne Halaas was awarded the prize for founding FAST (now owned by Microsoft) in 1997 at Norwegian University of Science and Technology: "Long before Google and others started thinking about search, this year's Honorary Prize winner created a skilled professional environment in search technology. It is more than 25 years since he [Halaas] established this professional environment, and he was central in the development of the technology that has led several search companies to establish development departments in Trondheim".
- 2011: Jon Stephenson von Tetzchner
- 2010: Yngvar Lundh, Pål Spilling and Dag Belsnes
- 2008: Georg Apenes
- 2007: Peter Hidas
- 2006: Jon Bing
- 2005: Lars Monrad-Krohn
- 2003: Thomas Hysing
- 2002: Gisle Hannemyr
- 2000: Jens Glad Balchen
- 1999: Helge Seip
- 1998: Ole-Johan Dahl and Kristen Nygaard

=== The Language Prize ===
Rosing's language prize is awarded for good use of the Norwegian language in connection with information and communication technology. The award has been given to individuals, organizations and for specific products. It was initialized in 2002 as a joint project between the Language Council of Norway and Norwegian Computer Society. As both ICT and language have developed, the jury has gradually emphasized the following criteria: curbing the use of English, good Norwegian language in general, such as the quality and diversity in the use of the Norwegian language. The latter includes making topics comprehensible, promotion of language forms and the use of good Norwegian in online channels.

- 2008: Lexin - online dictionaries for immigrants
- 2007: Yr.no
- 2006: The foundation "Åpne kontorprogram på norsk" (Open office programs in Norwegian)
- 2005: TISIP/Gylendal Akademisk
- 2003: Max Manus - speech recognition for radiology that delivers provided equipment to physicians for dictating patient status to patient records. In 2007 Max Manus delivered 400 solutions for speech recognition to 30 hospital wards. It is named after Max Manus.
- 2002: Tapir Akademiske Forlag AS

=== User-friendliness Prize ===
The competition for the user-friendliness prize is open to Norwegian-developed software, web solutions and user interfaces. The solution is assessed on the basis of principles of user-friendliness and an emphasis is placed on user interaction, visual design and adaption to users and tasks. The interdisciplinary jury, appointed by the expert group for User-Friendly IT Systems (BITS) in the Norwegian Computer Society, evaluates all nominated solutions and selects the finalists. The finalists will then have to demonstrate their solution to the jury before a winner is chosen.

- 2013: Great Norwegian Encyclopedia (Store Norske Leksikon) for snl.no
- 2012: Norwegian National Collection Agency (Statens innkrevingssentral)
