= Central Coast Mariners FC =

Association football club in Gosford, Australia

Central Coast Mariners
- Full name: Central Coast Mariners Football Club
- Nicknames: Mariners, The Yellow & Navy, Coasties
- Short name: CCM
- Founded: 1 November 2004; 22 years ago
- Ground: Polytec Stadium
- Capacity: 20,059
- Owner: Total Soccer Growth Holdings (TSG)
- Chairman: Ruben Gnanalingam
- Head Coach: John Hutchinson
- League: A-League Men
- 2025–26: 9th of 12
- Website: ccmariners.com.au
Home colours	Away colours	Third colours

Central Coast Mariners Football Club is an Australian professional association football club based in Gosford, on the Central Coast of New South Wales. It competes in the A-League Men, under licence from the Australian Professional Leagues (APL).

The Mariners were founded in 2004 and are one of the eight original A-League teams. It is the first professional sports club from the Gosford region to compete in a national competition. Despite being one of the smallest clubs in the league, the Central Coast Mariners are one of the most successful clubs in Australian soccer history, having won three A-League Championships from six Grand Final appearances, as well as the A-League Premiership three times. The club has also appeared in the AFC Champions League five times and won the AFC Cup once.

The club plays matches at Central Coast Stadium, a 20,059-seat stadium in Gosford; its purpose-built training facility, Mariners Centre of Excellence, is located in the suburb of Tuggerah. The facility is also home to a youth team that competes in the A-League Youth. The Mariners' main supporters' group is known as the Yellow Army, for the colour of the club's home kit. The club shares a rivalry with Newcastle Jets, known as the F3 Derby, after the previous name of the highway that connects the cities of the teams. Matt Simon is the Mariners' all-time leading goalscorer as of May 2022, with 66 goals in all competitions. The team record for matches played is held by John Hutchinson, who has appeared in 263 games for the Mariners.

== History ==
=== Formation (2004) ===
Central Coast Mariners' bid for a franchise in the Football Federation Australia's new A-League competition was aimed at filling the one spot for a regional team that was designated by the FFA. Media speculation prior to the announcement of the franchises in the new league suggested that the Mariners' bid may be favourable due to its new blood. Backing from former Australian international player and club technical director Alex Tobin, as well as Clean Up Australia personality Ian Kiernan—who would act as inaugural club chairman—also strengthened its proposal. As the only regional bidder, Central Coast was expected to make it into the league by default. Following a reported signed deal with the FFA, the club signed former Northern Spirit coach Lawrie McKinna as manager and Ian Ferguson, a former Rangers and Northern Spirit player, as coach. To aid the FFA's goals of building the profile of the sport, the Mariners created formal links with local state league team Central Coast United. On 1 November 2004, after much expectation, the club was announced as one of eight teams to become part of FFA's domestic competition, the A-League. The decision made Central Coast Mariners the first Gosford-based professional sports team to play in a national competition.

At the time of the formation of the new league in 2004, the club was owned by Spirits Sports and Leisure Group. The club announced its search for a star player under the league's allowance for one star player outside of the $1.5 million salary cap, insisting that the player should not look at the position as a retirement fund. Coach Lawrie McKinna sought interest from Australia national football team players Ante Milicic and Simon Colosimo, and announced that he may sign more than the three under-20 players required by league rules. Early concerns for the club focussed on concerns over financial stability, but after forming a partnership with technology company Toshiba and a cash injection from local businessman John Singleton, the club's financial worries were eased. McKinna was keen to sign local player Damien Brown of Bateau Bay, formerly of the Newcastle Jets. In a decision which prompted the player to declare that he was "over the moon", Brown became the first player to sign with the club. Club chairman Lyall Gorman was pleased that a local had become a "foundation player" and part of Brown's role would be to assist with selection of younger players from the local area. By early December 2004, the club had created a steady foundation of player signings and began negotiations with former Perth Glory striker Nik Mrdja, signing him later in the month as its star attacker. Mrjda was one of the most prominent players in the last season of the National Soccer League, scoring the final goal to secure Perth Glory's finals win. The club's management was reluctant to sign a star player outside of the $1.5 million salary cap, stipulating that they "would have to contribute on the pitch and get people to come to the ground."

=== Lawrie McKinna era (2004–2010) ===
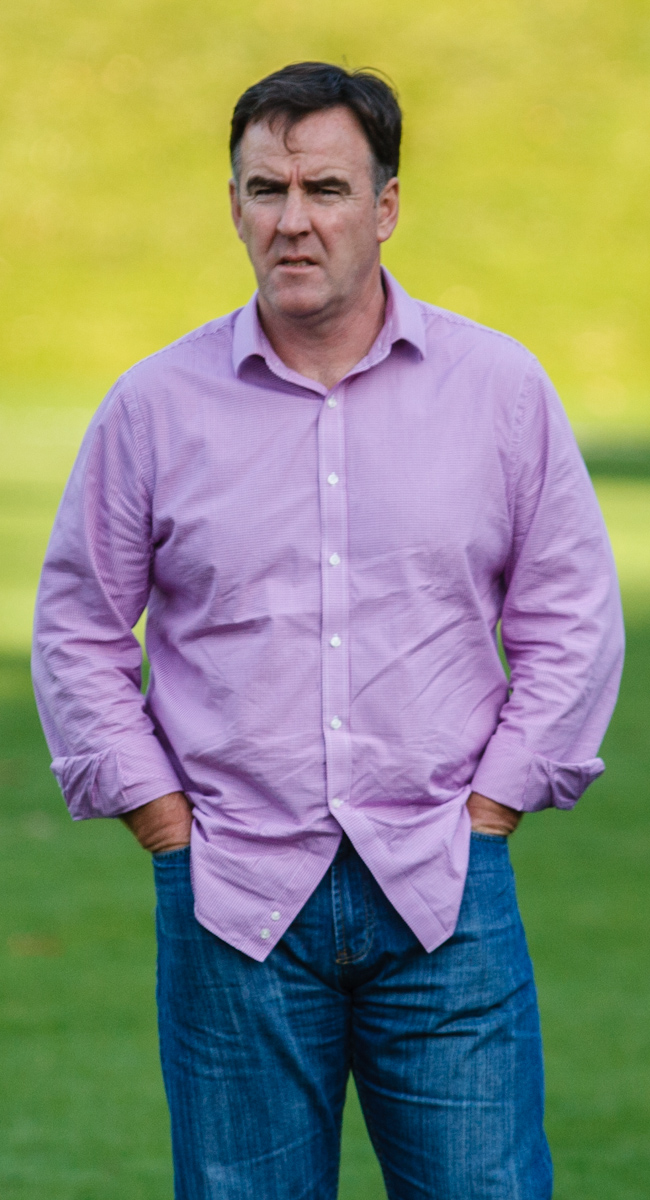
Lawrie McKinna was the first coach of Mariners

The Mariners' inaugural season was considered success most; the team reached the 2006 A-League Grand Final after finishing third during the regular season. Central Coast was defeated by Sydney FC 1–0 in front of a crowd of 41,689—a competition record at the time. The Mariners also won the 2005 Pre-Season Cup, defeating Perth Glory in the final 1–0. Before the 2006–07 A-League season, the Mariners secured the services of then-Australian international Tony Vidmar from NAC Breda for two years. This was the club's first marquee signing, following the lead of Sydney FC (Dwight Yorke) and Adelaide United (Qu Shengqing). Central Coast again reached the grand final in the 2006 Pre-Season Cup, losing to Adelaide United 5–4 on penalties after the score was tied 1–1 after extra time. The Mariners then participated in the 2006–07 A-League season, but was unable to gain a spot in the final series, finishing sixth after the regular season.

Club captain Noel Spencer was released by the Mariners, then signed to participate in the Asian Champions League by Sydney FC after the 2006–07 season, and Alex Wilkinson was appointed the new captain. Only 22 years of age at the time, Wilkinson had played every possible competitive match for the Mariners up to his appointment. In February 2008, Central Coast Mariners signed an arrangement with English Football League Championship side Sheffield United. The partnership was one of several connections the Mariners made with foreign clubs; other partner clubs included Ferencváros of Hungary, Chengdu Blades of China and São Paulo of Brazil. The agreement benefits the club by providing an opportunity for the youth programme and senior side to draw from the roster of Sheffield United through transfers. The teams also formed a property development joint venture, in the hopes that Central Coast could use its share of income to expand and bolster their Mariners Youth Academy.

The 2007–08 season saw Central Coast win its first premiership on goal difference ahead of Newcastle, following a final round that began with Central Coast and three other clubs level on 31 points. The final series began with a 2–0 loss to Newcastle in the first leg of its major semi-final, but the Mariners forced the tie to extra time by holding a 2–0 lead in the second leg after 90 minutes. A 94th-minute goal by Sasho Petrovski, who had scored earlier to level the tie, gave Central Coast a 3–2 win on aggregate, putting the Mariners through to the 2008 A-League Grand Final. In a rematch with Newcastle, the Jets defeated Central Coast 1–0 in the Grand Final, which ended in controversy due to an uncalled handball against Newcastle in Central Coast Mariners penalty box during the closing seconds of the match. If called, the foul would have given Central Coast a penalty kick and a chance to equalise. As Mariners players disputed referee Mark Shield's decision, goalkeeper Danny Vuković struck Shield on the arm, resulting in an immediate sending off and later suspension. Vuković was suspended from both domestic and international competition for nine months, with an additional six-months' suspended ban; the latter period was reduced to three months on appeal. Despite further appeals, the ban was eventually confirmed by FIFA in June, to include banning the young keeper from competing at the 2008 Olympic Games. The ban lasted into October; in response, Central Coast signed former Manchester United and Australian international keeper Mark Bosnich on a seven-week contract.

Before the 2008–09 season, Central Coast was predicted to be among the A-League leaders, but had a run of three losses in a row to end the regular season. Even with the losing streak, the club narrowly qualified for the finals, finishing in fourth, two points ahead of Sydney F.C. and Wellington Phoenix. Central Coast lost 4–1 on aggregate in their minor semi-final against Queensland Roar, ending the team's season.

=== Graham Arnold and Phil Moss era (2010–2015) ===
In February 2010, following the club's 2009–10 season, McKinna chose to move into a new role, becoming Central Coast's Football and Commercial Operations Manager. Socceroos assistant manager Graham Arnold was appointed as the club's new manager, becoming its second manager. In the lead-up to the 2010–11 season, numerous transfers resulted in changes to the club's squad. The Mariners announced the signing of 2005 Under 20s World Cup winner Patricio Pérez of Argentina in June 2010, followed by Dutch defender Patrick Zwaanswijk. In July 2010, it was announced that the Mariners' women's team would not compete in the 2010–11 W-League competition. The club stated that financial reasons were behind the decision, after Football NSW withdrew its funding.

In spite of relatively low expectations in the lead up to the season, the 2010–11 season was more successful for the club than 2009–10; the A-League and youth league teams both finished second in their respective leagues in the regular season. The senior team was then defeated by the premiers, Brisbane Roar, 4–2 on aggregate over two legs in the major semi-final, before defeating Gold Coast United 1–0 in the Preliminary Final to qualify for the 2011 A-League Grand Final against Brisbane. By reaching the Grand Final, the club also qualified for the 2012 AFC Champions League. In a championship match that the A-League's website called "classic", Central Coast was defeated 4–2 in a penalty shootout after leading 2–0 with three minutes remaining in extra time to finish runners-up for the third time.

The 2011–12 season was similarly successful, as the club won the premiership for the second time in its history with 51 points, two more than second-place Brisbane. The club failed to qualify for a second successive Grand Final, though, losing 5–2 on aggregate to Brisbane in the major semi-final and 5–3 on penalties after a 1–1 draw with Perth Glory in the Grand Final Qualifier.

2013 A-League Grand Final starting lineup
Central Coast 2–0 Western Sydney

On 21 April 2013, after three losses in Grand Finals, Central Coast won its first A-League title, defeating first-year side Western Sydney Wanderers 2–0 in the Grand Final at Allianz Stadium. Arnold re-signed with the club for a further two seasons on 30 August 2013, but on 14 November it was confirmed that he had signed a two-year contract to become manager of J. League Division 1 side Vegalta Sendai, starting in January 2014. Former assistant manager Phil Moss was named the new head coach. Mariners general manager Peter Turnbull left the club as well, and New Zealand international Michael McGlinchey moved to the J. League to play for Arnold's new side. Central Coast finished the 2013–14 A-League regular season in third place, behind runner-up Western Sydney on goal difference. In the semi-final, the Mariners' championship hopes ended with a 2–0 loss to Western Sydney; the game came three days after the team was eliminated from the 2014 AFC Champions League after losing to Japanese club Sanfrecce Hiroshima 1–0 to finish last in their group.

In what was Moss's first pre-season as coach, he did little to change what Arnold had built at the club. The only major changes in the side were with the addition of Senegalese international Malick Mané and Hungarian Richárd Vernes, and Marcos Flores leaving the club, with Mile Sterjovski retiring. Mariners began the season on a high, progressing to the semi-finals of the 2014 FFA Cup and defeating local rivals Newcastle Jets 1–0 at home in the opening round of the A-League. However the season soon turned with the team failing to secure a win for the remainder of the year. After their elimination from the 2015 AFC Champions League qualifying play-off by Chinese side Guangzhou R&F and a continued poor league record after a short mid-season break, the club stood down Moss as head coach. The decision was made on 6 March 2015, with Mariners appointing technical director Tony Walmsley in an interim capacity and captain John Hutchinson in a dual player-coach role, until the end of the season. Portuguese player Fábio Ferreira also joined the team at the tail end of the season. On 15 April Walmsley was announced as Central Coast's permanent technical director and head coach for the 2015–16 season. The announcement came despite an end to the season in which the club finished the league in eighth position.

=== Post-Arnold era (2015–2020) ===
Central Coast had their equal-worst A-League performance to date in the 2015–16 season. Their 13 points, the fewest in club history, resulted in a last-place finish, and they set a league record by losing 20 games while winning only 3, a record low for the Mariners. Central Coast allowed 70 goals, the most in league history, and had a goal difference of −37, the worst by an A-League team. The Mariners' totals of goals conceded at home and away (32 and 38 respectively) were also A-League records, and they went the entire season without a clean sheet.

In the 2016 FFA Cup, Central Coast suffered a 2–1 loss to Green Gully SC at Green Gully Reserve, becoming just the second A-League team to be eliminated by a state league team in the FFA Cup. Following this loss the club sacked Walmsley on 8 August 2016, with coaching duties in the leadup to the 2016–17 season taken up by assistant coach John Hutchinson in a caretaker role.

On 29 August 2016, Paul Okon was hired as Central Coast's full-time coach, succeeding the sacked Tony Walmsley. In Okon's debut as Central Coast manager, the Mariners drew 3–3 with Perth Glory at Nib Stadium, after coming back from 3–0 down at half time. Okon achieved his first win as Central Coast manager in his fifth game in charge: a 2–1 win over defending champions Adelaide United at Hindmarsh Stadium on 6 November 2016. However, the Mariners ended the season in eighth.

On 2 August 2017, for the second consecutive year, the Mariners were knocked out of the FFA Cup by a state league team in the first round, after losing 3–2 to Blacktown City. During the 2017–18 A-League season, the Mariners were in the top four at one stage, but after a run of 11 games without a win the club dropped down the table. Okon resigned as manager with Central Coast in ninth entering the last four rounds of the regular season; Wayne O'Sullivan served as an interim manager following Okon's departure. With a six-game losing streak at the end of the season, the team finished last for the second time in three years. Former Brisbane manager Mike Mulvey was hired by Central Coast in 2018. In the first 21 matches of the 2018–19 A-League season, the Mariners won only once. Mulvey was replaced as manager by Alen Stajcic, the former head coach of the Australia women's national team. Despite two wins in his six games as a caretaker manager, the Mariners were unable to avoid finishing at the bottom of the table again. Stajcic was given a three-year contract after the season.

On 4 August 2020, after playing their last game of the 2019–20 season, the Mariners were put up for sale by owner Michael Charlesworth, putting the club at risk of leaving the Central Coast. If no buyer is found, the Mariners' A-League license would be handed back to the FFA.

=== Resurgence (2020–2025) ===

2023 A-League Men Grand Final starting lineup
Central Coast 6–1 Melbourne City

In his second full season at the club, in 2020–21, Stajcic made some large signings, re-acquiring the services of former player Oliver Bozanic and signing Costa Rican international Marco Urena. The season had begun well with the Mariners beating local rivals Sydney FC in Sydney for the first time in seven years. The Mariners sat in first place after 16 rounds, but would drop points during the later rounds to finish in third place. This qualified the club for their first finals appearance in seven years. They would then lose to Macarthur FC 2–0 in the elimination finals on 12 June 2021.

Stajcic resigned ahead of the 2021–22 season the club, and was replaced by Nick Montgomery. Montgomery's first season continued on the success of previous one. He brought the club to the FFA Cup final where they lost 2–1 to Melbourne Victory on 5 February 2022. The Mariners also finished fifth in the A-League

On 7 May 2022, co-founder of Anytime Fitness Australia, Richard Peil became the new owner and director of the club, ending the uncertainty surrounding the club's ownership.

On 3 June 2023, Central Coast played against Melbourne City in the 2023 A-League Men Grand Final. The Mariners defeated Melbourne City 6–1 to win the 2022-23 A-League Championship.

Ahead of the new season, Championship winning coach Nick Montgomery departed the club to become the head coach of Hibernian, and was replaced by former MK Dons coach Mark Jackson for the title defence. The 2023-24 season saw further success for the club, winning the A-League Premiership for finishing top of the table in the regular season, their first continental title after defeating Al Ahed in the 2024 AFC Cup final, and qualification for the upcoming A-League Finals Series. The Mariners would go on to beat Melbourne Victory 3–1 in extra time in the 2024 A-League Men Grand Final. This Achievement would mean that they had won the treble.

2024 AFC Cup Final starting lineup
Al Ahed 0–1 Central Coast

==== 2023–24 AFC Cup champions ====
Central Coast returned to the continental tournament after 9 years since their 2015 AFC Champions League appearance and also making their debut in the AFC Cup. The Mariners were drawn in Group G alongside Malaysian side Terengganu, Indonesian side Bali United and Philippines side Stallion Laguna. On 20 September 2023, Central Coast played their debut match in a 1–0 away lost against Terengganu. In the next match on 4 October, the Mariners recorded their highest ever continental win thrashing Stallion Laguna to a whopping 9–1 victory. Central Coast went on to top the group as leaders with 13 points in which they qualified to the knockout stage. In the knockout stage which is also known as the zonal semi-finals, the Mariners faced Cambodian side Phnom Penh Crown on 13 February 2024, Central Coast went on to win the match 4–0 with Ryan Edmondson scoring a hat-trick to secure the club advancing to the zonal finals facing against Macarthur FC on 22 February, Central Coast went on to win the match in a narrow 3–2 win in extra time thus qualifying to the Inter-zone play-off semi-finals facing off Indian side Odisha winning them 4–0 on aggregate and advanced to the Inter-zone play-off finals facing off against Kyrgyzstani side Abdysh-Ata Kant where the Mariners won 4–1 on aggregate thus qualified to the 2024 AFC Cup final facing against Lebanese side Al Ahed. On 5 May, Central Coast played their final match at the Sultan Qaboos Sports Complex in Oman where in the 84th minute, super sub Alou Kuol scored the only goal in the match to win the AFC Cup for Central Coast.

Following the sudden departure of Mark Jackson in the week prior to the start of the 2025–26 A-League season, Warren Moon was appointed as interim head coach on 15 October 2025. On 6 January 2026, he was confirmed as the permanent coach until the end of the season.

=== Ownership speculation and APL takeover (2024–) ===
On 12 October 2024, the then-owner and chairman of the club, Richard Peil handed the ownership back to previous owner, Mike Charlesworth.

On 1 December 2025, it was reported that former Sydney Olympic FC President Damon Hanlin had submitted an application to acquire the club. Hanlin had previously been appointed as a director and secretary of new entity Central Coast Mariners Football Club Foundation Limited in October, as part of a change in corporate structure. The news comes admidst speculation that Hanlin had been funding the club and had installed Olympic head coach Labinot Haliti as the Director of Football, however on 18 November, current CEO Greg Brownlow had denied their involvement at that point in time.

On 12 January 2026, the Australian Professional Leagues (APL) announced that it has taken over operational control of the club whilst a new owner is found. The Sydney Morning Herald reported that the sale of the club to Hanlin had fallen through and that the APL takeover "represented a clean slate" and is now in discussions with multiple parties, including with English club Queens Park Rangers.

On 13 January 2026, the Central Coast Mariners Academy was placed into liquidation. On 23 January 2026, the APL announced it would take over operations of the academy through to the end of the 2026 NPL season.

On 23 June 2026, The Australian Professional Leagues (APL) has announced Total Soccer Growth Holdings (TSG) as the new owner of the Central Coast Mariners FC. A privately-owned international business, Total Soccer Growth Holdings is the majority shareholder of English Championship side Queens Park Rangers (UK) and owns a stake in Los Angeles FC (USA). The sale did not include the Mariners' A-League Women side.

On 4 August 2026, Holman Barnes Group (HBG), majority owners of NRL club Wests Tigers, was confirmed as the new owners of the women's team. Under this arrangement, the licence for the club would remain with TSG, where as HBG would take on the day-to-day responsibilities for running the A-League Women department.

== Colours and badge ==
The home jersey worn by the Mariners is mostly yellow with sleeves that are navy blue. The away uniform is a mostly plain navy blue jersey with yellow as a secondary colour. In the 2011–12 season, the club had its kits manufactured by Hummel, as the A-League's Reebok deal had expired at the conclusion of the 2010–11 season. In September 2012, it was announced that the Mariners had signed a two-year deal with Kappa for them to be the official apparel supplier. The team logo is a yellow football at the centre of a blue curling wave, which symbolises the beaches of the Central Coast.

Since 2012, the Mariners have worn special pink kits for one match in October to raise money and awareness for Pink Ribbon Day, part of National Breast Cancer Awareness Month. The Mariners club collected donations at the ground, as well as auctioning the match-worn kits on online auction site eBay with proceeds going to the charity.

=== Kit Evolution ===
- Home

2005–2007	2007–2009	2009–2011	2011–2012	2012–2014

2014–2015	2015–2016	2016–2017	2017–2018	2018–2019

2019–2020	2020–2021	2021–2022	2022–2023	2023–

== Sponsorship ==
Period	Kit Manufacturer	Shirt Sponsor	Back Sponsor
2005–2006	Reebok	Future School	None
2006–2008	Reebok	Central Coast	Rebel Sport
2008–2010	Reebok	Central Coast	None
2010–2011	Reebok	Central Coast	Primo Smallgoods
2011–2012	Hummel	Soccer5s	Primo Smallgoods
2012–2013	Kappa	Masterfoods	Primo Smallgoods
2013–2015	Kappa	Masterfoods	Westinghouse Solar
2015–2016	Kappa	Masterfoods	Search Technologies
2016–2018	Umbro	Masterfoods	Dyldam
2018–2021	Umbro	Masterfoods	State Roads Construction
2021–2023	Paladin	Mate	State Roads Construction
2023–2024	Cikers	Mate	eToro
2024-present	Cikers	Polytec	Liberty

=== AFC Competition Sponsorship ===
Year	Kit Manufacturer	Shirt Sponsor
2009	Reebok	thecoast.cc
2012	Hummel	Search Technologies
2013	Kappa	5100 Tibet Glacial Spring Water
2014	Kappa	5100 Tibet Glacial Spring Water
2015	Kappa	Haisheng
2023-24	Cikers	AirAsia; Anytime Fitness (final only)
2024-25	Cikers	No sponsor (Matchweek 1-4); Dyson Logistics (Matchweek 5 onwards)

== Stadium ==
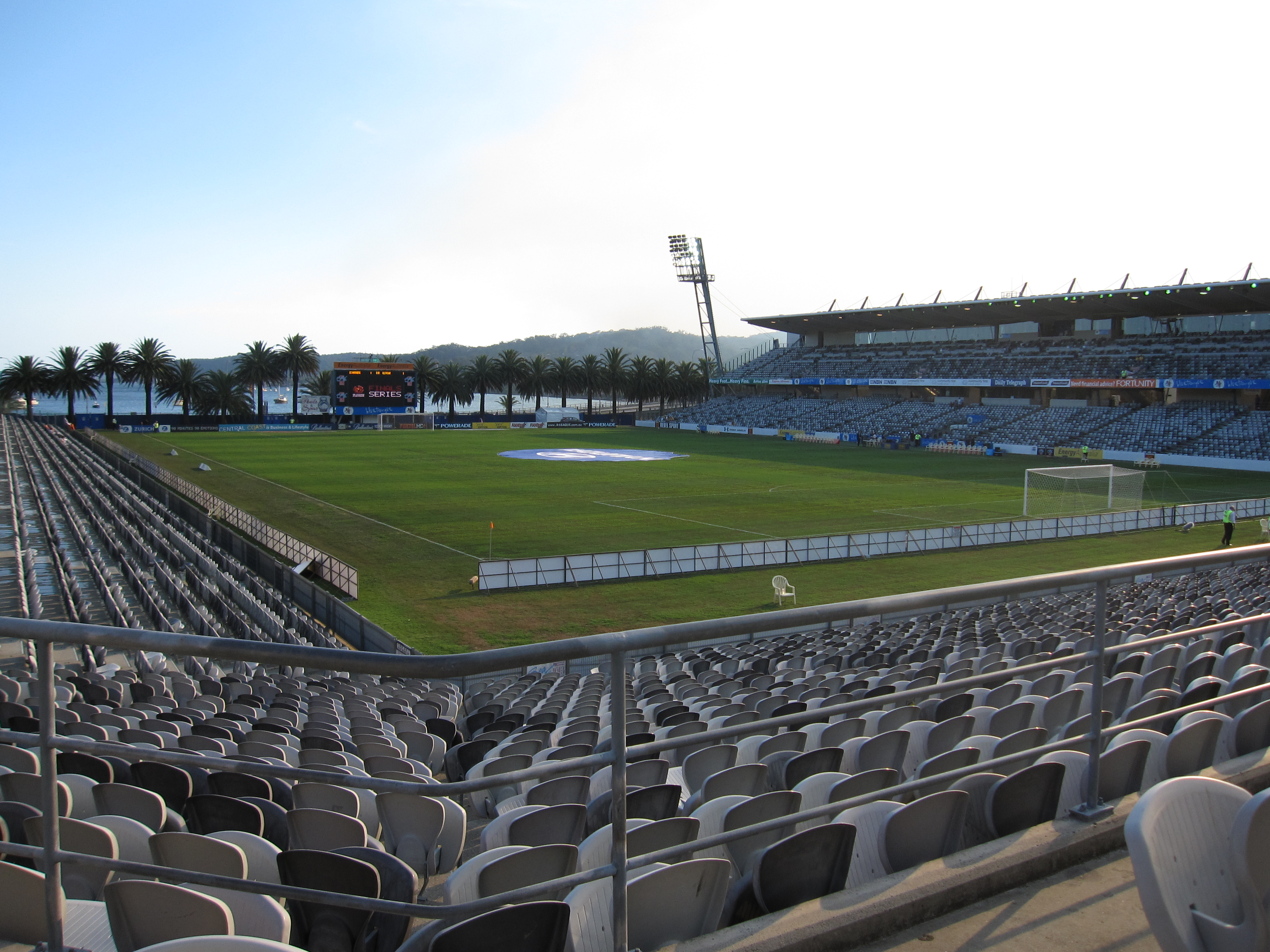
Central Coast Stadium, home ground of Central Coast Mariners

Central Coast Mariners plays home games at Central Coast Stadium, Gosford. It is located in Grahame Park, between the Gosford Central Business District and the Brisbane Water foreshore. It is constructed to make the most of its location, being open at the southern end, giving filtered views of Brisbane Water through a row of large palm trees. It is within walking distance of Gosford railway station and is adjacent to the Central Coast Leagues Club.

The stadium has a capacity of 20,059,^{[I]} and the highest attendance for a Mariners game was a sold-out 21,379 in the 2024 Grand Final, assisted with portable seating at the southern end of the ground. Difficulties in drawing spectators led the Mariners to schedule matches in the 2013–14 and 2014–15 seasons away from Central Coast Stadium, at North Sydney Oval and Brookvale Oval. The club's goal was to play closer to its fan base in north Sydney, which majority owner Michael Charlesworth estimated to be about 20% of its total supporters. Following attendances at North Sydney Oval that were similar to those at Central Coast Stadium, Football Federation Australia CEO David Gallop suggested in December 2014 that it would be unlikely that the club would be permitted to continue playing in north Sydney.

== Supporters and rivalries ==
The active supporters' group for the Mariners is called the Yellow Army, who sit in bay 16 of Central Coast Stadium during home games. In addition to the Yellow Army, there is a Central Coast Mariners Official Supporters Club, which was established during 2013. The Central Coast region has about 300,000 residents, which gives the Mariners the A-League's smallest local fan base. Accordingly, the Mariners acquired a small-market image among commentators.

The Mariners developed a strong rivalry with Newcastle Jets throughout their first season, often referred to as the F3 Derby. The naming is a title previously used for the Sydney–Newcastle Freeway, the major motorway which joins the two clubs' cities. The rivalry's origins date back to before the teams played against each other in the A-League. A May 2005 Oceania Club Championship qualification match, which went to a penalty shootout that the Mariners won, helped create hostility between the sides. In the game, a tackle by Central Coast's Mrdja broke one of Newcastle player Andrew Durante's legs, causing him to miss the following A-League season; Mrdja offered no apology for the tackle, upsetting Jets players. Fans of the clubs battled verbally before and after one 2011 derby match, leading the Newcastle Herald's Josh Leeson to call their actions "immature and laughable." In more recent seasons, the F3 Derby has gained less attention in the press than the derbies in Melbourne and Sydney, but Central Coast player Nicholas Fitzgerald maintains that "the players and fans still take it very seriously."

Central Coast also have a rivalry with Sydney FC. Like Newcastle, Sydney FC is close in proximity to Central Coast. In 2006, the Central Coast Express Advocate's Richard Noone called the Central Coast–Sydney rivalry "Arguably A-League's fiercest".

== Affiliated clubs ==
Through an investment in the Mariners by Total Soccer Growth Holdings (TSG) the club has the following international affiliations:

- (England) Queens Park Rangers
- (United States) Los Angeles FC

Through a previous agreement, the club was connected to the following teams:

- (England) Sheffield United
- (Brazil) São Paulo
- (Hungary) Ferencváros

In addition, the club had a player development partnership with the following international clubs:

- (England) Everton
- (Hong Kong) Southern
- (Portugal) Portimonense

The club has formal relationships with the following organisations in Australia:

- Central Coast United

The club previously had formal relationships with the following organisations in Australia:

- Northbridge (as North Shore Mariners Academy 2014–2020)

== Players ==
=== First-team squad ===
As of 21 October 2026

Note: Flags indicate national team as defined under FIFA eligibility rules; some limited exceptions apply. Players may hold more than one non-FIFA nationality.

No.	Pos.	Nation	Player
3	DF	AUS	Diesel Herrington
4	DF	AUS	Trent Sainsbury (captain)
5	DF	AUS	Lucas Mauragis
6	MF	AUS	Haine Eames
8	MF	AUS	Chris Donnell
9	FW	AUS	Oliver Lavale
11	FW	ENG	John-Kymani Gordon
12	DF	SCO	Noah McCann
15	DF	NZL	Storm Roux
16	MF	AUS	Harry Steele
17	FW	AUS	Presley Ortiz
20	GK	NGR	Rufai Abubakar
21	DF	JAM	Daniel Scarlett
22	FW	AUS	Arthur De Lima (scholarship)
23	MF	JPN	Taiyo Hisamatsu
29	MF	AUS	Kristian Popovic

No.	Pos.	Nation	Player
30	GK	AUS	Andrew Redmayne
37	FW	AUS	Bailey Brandtman (scholarship)
39	MF	AUS	Alex Bolton (scholarship)
40	GK	AUS	Dylan Peraić-Cullen
41	DF	AUS	Shumba Mutokoyi (scholarship)
42	FW	AUS	Max Naylor
43	FW	AUS	Luke Becvinovski
44	MF	AUS	Oliver O'Carroll (scholarship)
45	MF	AUS	Jesse Mantell (scholarship)
46	DF	AUS	Callum McCaskey (scholarship)
47	DF	AUS	Stevan Rujak (scholarship)
48	FW	AUS	Noah Hooper (scholarship)
50	GK	AUS	Jai Ajanovic (scholarship)
72	FW	IRQ	Ali Auglah
—	DF	AUS	Gabriel Tilo (scholarship)
—	GK	NZL	Will Martin (scholarship)

=== Youth ===
Note: Flags indicate national team as defined under FIFA eligibility rules; some limited exceptions apply. Players may hold more than one non-FIFA nationality.

No.	Pos.	Nation	Player
51	MF	AUS	Ty McKibbin
52	FW	AUS	Isaac Kwon

No.	Pos.	Nation	Player
57	MF	AUS	Aston Reid
58	MF	AUS	Laurence Taylor

=== Out on loan ===
Note: Flags indicate national team as defined under FIFA eligibility rules; some limited exceptions apply. Players may hold more than one non-FIFA nationality.

No.	Pos.	Nation	Player
14	FW	AUS	Nicholas Duarte (on loan at Wollongong Wolves until end of 2026 Australian Championship)

=== Retired numbers ===
- 19 – (Australia) Matt Simon (forward, 2006–12, 2013–15, 2018–22)

== Club officials ==
=== Management ===
Position	Name
Chairman	(Malaysia) Ruben Gnanalingam

=== Technical staff ===
Position	
Sporting director	(Australia) Matt Simon
Head coach	(Malta) John Hutchinson
Assistant coach	(Australia) Josh Rose
Goalkeeping Coach	(Australia) Danny Vukovic
Analyst	(Australia) Liam Chauncy
A-League Team Manager	(Australia) Darren Dobson
Lead Strength and Conditioning Coach	(Cook Islands) Cade Mapu
Head Physiotherapist	(Netherlands) Nick Van Reede
Academy Co-ordinator	(Cambodia) Cameron Stone
Head of NPL Men	(Brazil) Lucas Vilela

=== Managers ===
Name	Period	Honours	Ref(s)
(Scotland) Lawrie McKinna	2004–2010	A-League Premiership: 2007–08; A-League Pre-Season Challenge Cup: 2005; A-League Coach of the Year: 2005–06	
(Australia) Graham Arnold	2010–2013	A-League Premiership: 2011–12; A-League Championship: 2013; A-League Coach of the Year: 2011–12	
(Australia) Phil Moss	2013–2015	—	
(England) Tony Walmsley	2015–2016	—	
(Australia) Paul Okon	2016–2018	—	
(Republic of Ireland) Wayne O'Sullivan	2018 (a.i.)	—	
(England) Mike Mulvey	2018–2019	—	
(Australia) Alen Stajcic	2019–2021	—	
(Scotland) Nick Montgomery	2021–2023	A-League Men Championship: 2023	
(England) Mark Jackson	2023–2025	A-League Men Premiership: 2023–24; A-League Men Championship: 2024; AFC Cup: 2023–24	
(Australia) Warren Moon	2025–2026	—	

== Club captains ==
Dates	Name	Notes	Honours (as captain)
2005–2007	(Australia) Noel Spencer	Inaugural club captain	2005 A-League Pre-Season Challenge Cup
2007–2012	(Australia) Alex Wilkinson		2007–08 A-League Premiership; 2011–12 A-League Premiership
2012–2015	(Malta) John Hutchinson		2012–13 A-League Championship
2015–2017	(Scotland) Nick Montgomery		
2017–2018	(Spain) Alan Baró		
2018–2020	(Australia) Matt Simon		
2020–2022	(Australia) Oliver Bozanic		
2022–2024	(Australia) Danny Vukovic		2022–23 A-League Men Championship; 2023–24 A-League Men Premiership 2023–24 A-League Men Championship; 2023–24 AFC Cup
2024–	(Australia) Trent Sainsbury		

== Records ==
John Hutchinson currently holds the team record for number of total games played with 271 matches in all competitions. Former captain Matt Simon has the second most appearances for the club with 238 matches. Alex Wilkinson, Joshua Rose and Storm Roux are the tied third most capped player with 206 appearances each. As of 2020, Central Coast's all-time highest goalscorers in all competitions is Matt Simon with 66 goals, twenty-three more than Adam Kwasnik. Jason Cummings has scored the third most goals for the club with 31.

Central Coast's highest attendance at its home stadium, Central Coast Stadium, was 19,238 against Newcastle Jets in their round 19 match of the 2007–08 season. This was the second highest crowd at the ground for any sport since the first match at Central Coast Stadium in February 2000. This record attendance at Central Coast stadium was broken during the 2022–23 season for the second leg of the A-league semi-final against Adelaide United FC. The Mariners won 2–0 (4–1 on aggregate) in front of a sell-out crowd of 20,059 people. The attendance record was further broken at the 2024 Grand Final, where 21,379 attended the game, ending in a 3–1 win for the Mariners after extra time.

== Continental record ==
Season	Competition	Round	Club	Home	Away	Aggregate
2009	AFC Champions League	Group E	(China) Beijing Guoan	2–1	0–2	2nd out of 4
2009	AFC Champions League	Group E	(South Korea) Ulsan Hyundai	2–0	1–0	2nd out of 4
2009	AFC Champions League	Group E	(Japan) Nagoya Grampus	0–1	1–1	2nd out of 4
2009	AFC Champions League	Round of 16	(South Korea) Pohang Steelers	0–6		
2012	AFC Champions League	Group G	(China) Tianjin Teda	5–1	0–0	3rd out of 4
2012	AFC Champions League	Group G	(Japan) Nagoya Grampus	1–1	0–3	3rd out of 4
2012	AFC Champions League	Group G	(South Korea) Seongnam Ilhwa Chunma	1–1	0–5	3rd out of 4
2013	AFC Champions League	Group H	(South Korea) Suwon Samsung Bluewings	0–0	1–0	2nd out of 4
2013	AFC Champions League	Group H	(Japan) Kashiwa Reysol	0–3	1–3	2nd out of 4
2013	AFC Champions League	Group H	(China) Guizhou Renhe	2–1	1–2	2nd out of 4
2013	AFC Champions League	Round of 16	(China) Guangzhou Evergrande	1–2	0–3	1–5
2014	AFC Champions League	Group F	(South Korea) FC Seoul	0–1	0–2	4th out of 4
2014	AFC Champions League	Group F	(Japan) Sanfrecce Hiroshima	2–1	0–1	4th out of 4
2014	AFC Champions League	Group F	(China) Beijing Guoan	1–0	1–2	4th out of 4
2015	AFC Champions League	Qualifying play-off round	(China) Guangzhou R&F	1–3		
2023–24	AFC Cup	Group G	(Malaysia) Terengganu	1–1	0–1	1st out of 4
2023–24	AFC Cup	Group G	(Philippines) Stallion Laguna	9–1	3–0	1st out of 4
2023–24	AFC Cup	Group G	(Indonesia) Bali United	6–3	2–1	1st out of 4
2023–24	AFC Cup	ASEAN Zonal semi-finals	(Cambodia) Phnom Penh Crown	4–0		
2023–24	AFC Cup	ASEAN Zonal final	(Australia) Macarthur FC	3–2 (a.e.t.)		
2023–24	AFC Cup	Inter-zone play-off semi-finals	(India) Odisha	4–0	0–0	4–0
2023–24	AFC Cup	Inter-zone play-off final	(Kyrgyzstan) Abdysh-Ata Kant	3–0	1–1	4–1
2023–24	AFC Cup	Final	(Lebanon) Al Ahed	1–0		
2024–25	AFC Champions League Elite	League stage	(China) Shandong Taishan	—N/a	1–3 (Voided)	11th out of 11
2024–25	AFC Champions League Elite	League stage	(Thailand) Buriram United	1–2	—N/a	11th out of 11
2024–25	AFC Champions League Elite	League stage	(China) Shanghai Port	—N/a	2–3	11th out of 11
2024–25	AFC Champions League Elite	League stage	(China) Shanghai Shenhua	2–2	—N/a	11th out of 11
2024–25	AFC Champions League Elite	League stage	(Japan) Vissel Kobe	—N/a	2–3	11th out of 11
2024–25	AFC Champions League Elite	League stage	(Japan) Yokohama F. Marinos	0–4	—N/a	11th out of 11
2024–25	AFC Champions League Elite	League stage	(Malaysia) Johor Darul Ta'zim	1–2	—N/a	11th out of 11
2024–25	AFC Champions League Elite	League stage	(Japan) Kawasaki Frontale	—N/a	0–2	11th out of 11

== Honours ==
=== Domestic ===
==== A-League ====
Chart of yearly table positions for Central Coast Mariners in A-League Men

- A-League Men Championship
  - Winners (3): 2013, 2023, 2024
  - Runners-up (3): 2006, 2008, 2011
- A-League Men Premiership
  - Winners (3): 2007–08, 2011–12, 2023–24
  - Runners-up (3): 2010–11, 2012–13, 2022–23

==== Cups ====
- Australia Cup
  - Runners-up (1): 2021
- A-League Pre-Season Challenge Cup
  - Winners (1): 2005
  - Runners-up (1): 2006

=== Continental ===
- AFC Cup / AFC Champions League Two
  - Winners (1): 2023–24

=== The Mariners Medal (Player of the Year) ===
Season	Winner
2005–06	(Australia) Michael Beauchamp
2006–07	(Australia) Danny Vukovic
2007–08	(Australia) Mile Jedinak
2008–09	(Australia) Matt Simon
2009–10	(Australia) Danny Vukovic

Season	Winner
2010–11	(Australia) Josh Rose
2011–12	(Australia) Mathew Ryan
2012–13	(Australia) Trent Sainsbury
2013–14	(Australia) Liam Reddy
2014–15	(Australia) Anthony Caceres

Season	Winner
2015–16	(Australia) Liam Rose
2016–17	(Australia) Paul Izzo
2017–18	(Australia) Ben Kennedy
2018–19	(Australia) Aiden O'Neill
2019–20	(Australia) Mark Birighitti

Season	Winner
2020–21	(Australia) Kye Rowles
2021–22	(Australia) Kye Rowles
2022–23	(Australia) Josh Nisbet
2023–24	(Australia) Max Balard
2024–25	(Brazil) Mikael Doka

=== Team of the decade ===

Substitutes: Danny Vukovic, Trent Sainsbury, Adam Kwasnik, Mile Sterjovski, Matt Simon
2005–2014 Central Coast Mariners
Football Club Team of the Decade

== See also ==
- Central Coast Mariners FC (W-League)
- Central Coast Mariners Academy
- List of Central Coast Mariners FC seasons
