= Context Labs =

Context Labs, BV
- Type: Private
- Industry: Software, IT
- Founded: 2013; 13 years ago
- Headquarters: Amsterdam, Netherlands and Cambridge, Massachusetts
- Key people: Daniel Harple, CEO
- Website: www.contextlabs.com

Context Labs (CXL) is a company that provides blockchain enabled platform solutions such as secure distributed ledgers, network graph analytics, and data interoperability and visualization for publishing, financial, trading and supply chain industries. Headquartered in Amsterdam, Netherlands and Cambridge, Massachusetts, the company was founded in 2013.

== History ==
Context Labs, BV was founded in 2013 by Daniel Harple, a technology entrepreneur and internet pioneer in web streaming and VoIP. With offices in Amsterdam, Netherlands and Cambridge, Massachusetts, the company was formed with the objective of extending research and development begun at MIT Sloan and the MIT Media Lab focusing on "innovation dynamics".

Partnering with architectural design firm Rogers Partners in 2014, the company applied innovation dynamics methods to collaborate on the design for the Connect Kendall Square project.

In March 2016, R. R. Donnelley & Sons announced it would partner with the company to integrate Context Labs blockchain enabled platform technology within RR Donnelley’s print-to-digital supply chain solutions.

In June 2016, Context Labs announced that as a co-founding member, the company would provide operational, strategic, and technical guidance for the Open Music Initiative, a digital rights framework for the music industry.

== Products ==
- InnovationScope
- Chainplate Foundation
- Snapshackle Interoperability
- VUEGraph Analytics

== See also ==
- Business Intelligence Tools
