= VSW =

VSW may refer to:

- Very Short Wave, a form of Very high frequency
- Vertical Search Works, a semantic web search company
- Vanderbilt spoken word, a spoken word performance organization at Vanderbilt University
- .vsw, a file extension for Visio Workspace files
- Visual Studies Workshop, an arts organization in Rochester, NY
