= Enterprise content integration =

Enterprise Content Integration (ECI) refers to middleware software technology used by large organizations to connect with various computer systems that manage documents and digital content. ECI systems typically operate alongside other technologies, including enterprise content management, document management, groupware, intranets, and records management.

This approach enables organizations to efficiently manage content from diverse sources. ECI systems are engineered to integrate seamlessly with existing software solutions within an organization, offering robust capabilities for searching, indexing, and accessing information across multiple systems. By facilitating decentralized content management, ECI empowers organizations to retrieve and leverage unstructured content, such as documents, from various repositories.

== Overview ==
ECI is often deployed alongside a broader ecosystem of content and information management systems. While enterprise content management (ECM) governs the lifecycle of content within a single authoritative repository, ECI operates across multiple disparate repositories, federating access without requiring consolidation or migration. Document management systems provide version control and storage for discrete files; ECI complements these by enabling cross-system search and retrieval without displacing existing document stores.

Groupware platforms support collaboration and communication within an organization, and ECI can surface relevant content from those platforms alongside other repositories in a unified query. Intranets serve as internal publishing and access layers; ECI systems can be configured to deliver federated search results within intranet portal environments.

Records management systems impose retention schedules and compliance controls on content; ECI can index records repositories to make governed content discoverable while leaving records management workflows intact.

== Functions ==
ECI systems, particularly Unified Information Access systems, aim to address the increasing recognition that "unstructured content", such as a series of documents, can be significant and contribute to business development. Additionally, these systems enhance the efficiency with which organizations retrieve data by providing a unified channel for accessing a diverse range of storage locations.

Enterprise content integration seeks to meet several critical needs within today's organizations, including:

- Migrating content (documents and images) from one system to another.
- Synchronizing partial or complete content between two or more repositories.
- Searching for documents across all content repositories.
- Offering a single point of access to all organizational documents and content.
- Publishing or disseminating this content to other systems (enterprise portals, websites).

== Features ==
ECI functions through the use of a metadata catalogue that contains records regarding data throughout the enterprise, enabling users to seek, browse, locate, and retrieve necessary information. ECI metadata catalogues can collect data from a wide array of sources, including digital asset management systems, file servers, web servers, and individual users' PCs. Vendors sometimes refer to this form of decentralized content management as a virtual repository or a virtual file system.

In addition to gathering data for the metadata catalogue, some ECI systems can connect directly to the resources offered by a computer system through interfaces such as API's. These connections are often referred to as adapters, connectors, or content bridges by ECI vendors.

ECI systems can also offer automated aggregation, packaging, and distribution of indexed content through administrator-configurable channels, allowing for flexible reporting and powerful analytical capabilities across various data sources. ECI administrators can design the system by specifying rules for how indexed content should be packaged and how and to whom the content should be delivered. To achieve these objectives, some ECI systems can integrate with other computer systems, including publishing systems and format converters, often utilizing web service interfaces.

== Vendors ==
A number of vendors have provided ECI solutions throughout the history of the technology. One of the first was Context Media (now owned by Oracle); their Interchange Platform (now known as Interchange Suite 3.0) provided several advanced features, including a dashboard interface for monitoring the flow of content and the creation of metadata, a component that allowed the definition of relationships among collected data, and a packaging and distribution function.

Venetica Corporation, founded in 1993, also pioneered ECI solutions with its flagship Venice Bridge product. Venetica was acquired in 2004 by IBM and its ECI technology is now sold as IBM Content Integrator, which provides out-of-the-box connectors for the industry's most popular content management systems, as well as several features for federation and developer services.

Agari Mediaware was another company among the first wave of ECI solution providers. However, the company filed for bankruptcy in July 2003. This was likely due to the product's poor market reception; many implementers viewed it as an architecture rather than a complete solution, and most companies desired a solution that could be quickly implemented and enabled with a minimum of additional effort.

A number of search-based applications vendors sell ECI systems, such as Aspire (Search Technologies), (Exalead), and Documentum.
