= Panos Panay =

Panos Panay may refer to:

- Panos Panay (music executive) (born 1972), Cypriot/American music executive
- Panos Panay (technology executive), American technology executive, cousin of the above
