= Ezmo =

Online music player

- Website type: Free Online Music Player
- Available in: English, German, Spanish, French, Italian, Norwegian, Portuguese
- Owner: Fast Search & Transfer
- Website: www.ezmo.com
- Commercial: Yes
- Registration: Free
- Launched: 8 June 2007
- Current status: Discontinued

Ezmo was a free, online music player launched on 8 June 2007 which allowed users to stream and share their personal music collections. Ezmo was in its beta phase when it was discontinued on 14 March 2008 due to a lack of funding. The service used technology from Fast Search & Transfer and Adobe Flex. Ezmo was a fully owned subsidiary of Fast Search & Transfer.

== Availability and usage ==
Ezmo was launched in Europe before it was made available in the United States on 25 October 2007.

Users could upload music from iTunes or Windows Media Player to their Ezmo accounts, and share their songs with up to ten friends.

A mobile application for Ezmo was launched in early 2008.
