= Gisle Hannemyr =

Norwegian computer science researcher

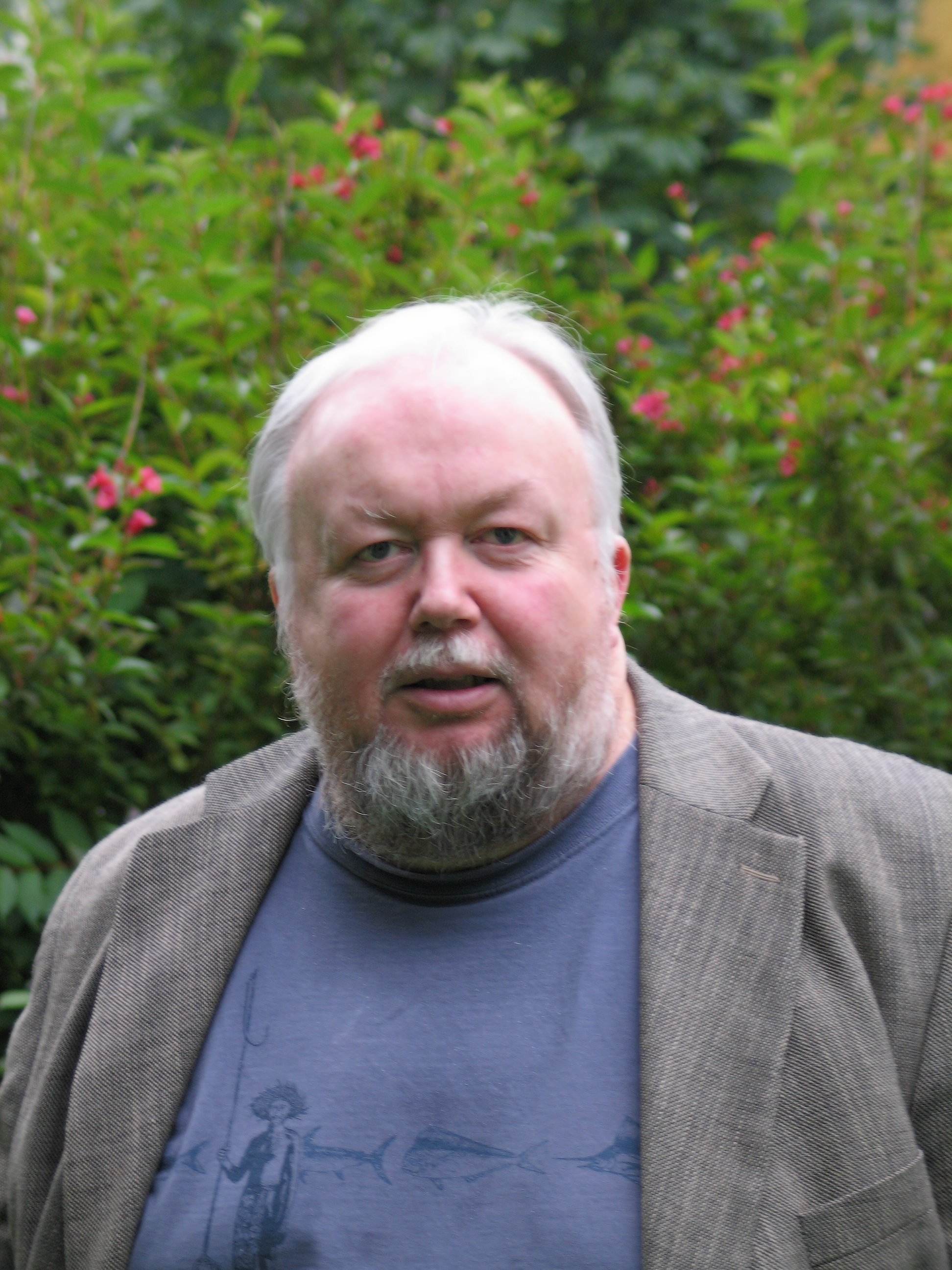
Gisle Hannemyr

Gisle Hannemyr (born 3 July 1953) is a researcher and lecturer at the Department of Informatics, University of Oslo.

== Professional background ==
In 1991, he was co-founder of the first commercial internet service provider in Norway, Oslonett, which later, being acquired by Schibsted, became Schibsted Nett (SN), and Scandinavia Online (Sol). He later co-founded other Internet-related businesses.

Through books, articles and regular columns in the press, Hannemyr has been active in describing and explaining not only the Internet, but also hacker culture to the public. In the public eye, he is regarded as Norway's foremost net guru and evangelist, and is the primary spokesperson for free software, free media formats and open net usage in Norwegian media.

In 2002, Hannemyr received the Norwegian Computer Society's Rosing Honorary Prize. In 2003, the 800 attendees at a First Tuesday event voted him Norway's Internet Personality of the Decade.
