= Michael Hendrix =

American graphic designer and entrepreneur

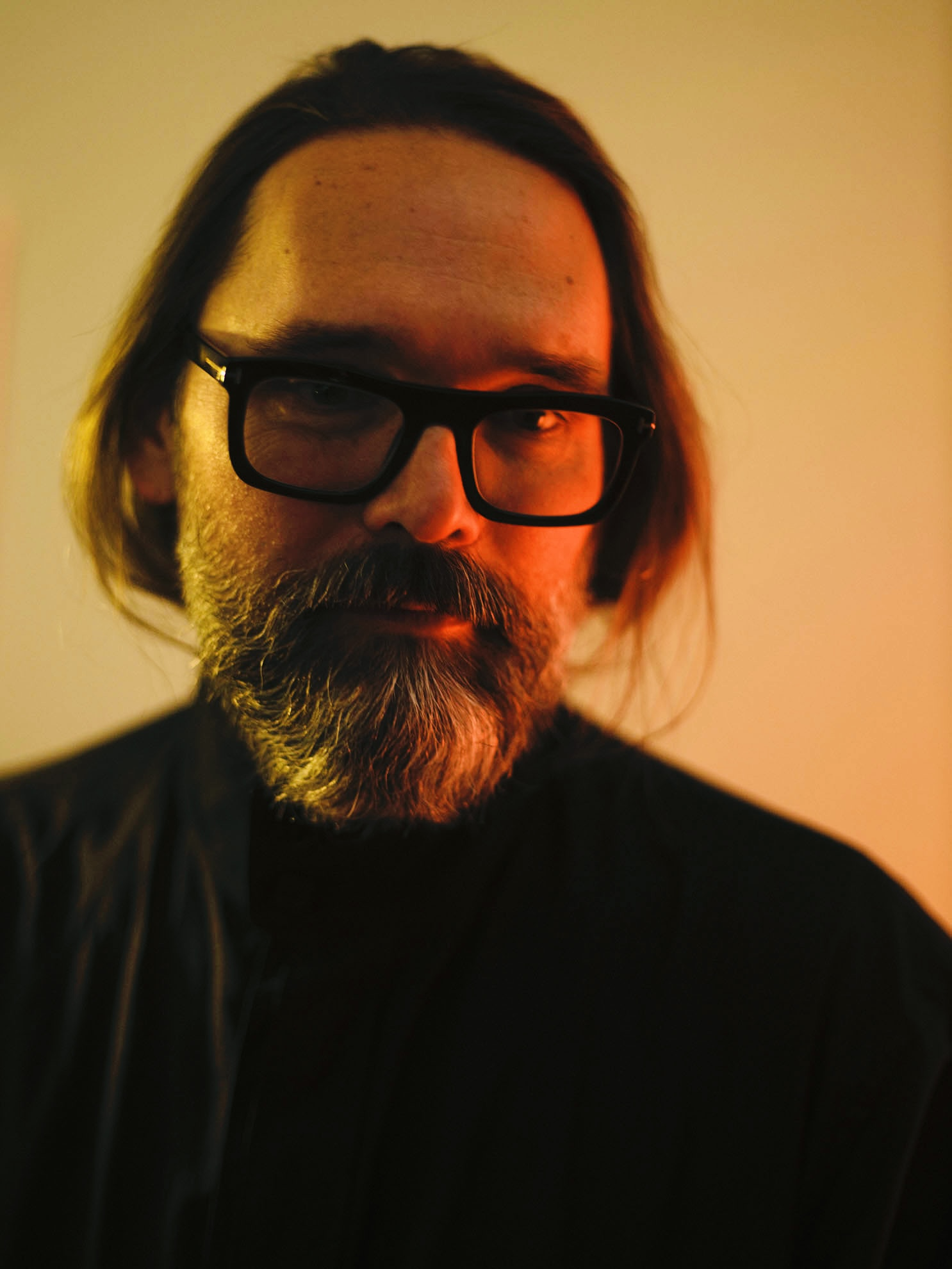
R. Michael Hendrix by Marino Thorlacius, 2023

R. Michael Hendrix is an American graphic designer, entrepreneur, educator, and musician, known for being a partner and director at IDEO.

== Biography ==
Hendrix graduated from the University of Tennessee in 1994 with a Bachelor of Fine Arts in Graphic Design. In 2002, he co-founded sustainable design firm Tricycle Inc. He was a Partner and the Global Design Director of design firm IDEO, based in the Cambridge, Massachusetts, studio.

Hendrix has taught at the Berklee College of Music and at Bifröst University in Iceland, and is a co-founder of the Open Music Initiative, a research and advocacy organization focused on music rights and technology. Hendrix writes and performs music as R.M. Hendrix. In 2014 he released "Urban Turks Country Jerks" on Moon Sounds Records, and was named one of the "fifty finest artists" of the year by Drowned in Sound. In 2025 he released recordings YUKS and The Hole, both reviewed extensively for their layered production.

== Recognition ==
Hendrix has received the following national awards:

- 2006: Industrial Designers Society of America IDEA award.
- 2008: AIGA Fellow in graphic design;

He has also been recognized for design excellence by Cooper Hewitt, Smithsonian Design Museum 2010 Triennial, "Why Design Now?", and American design organizations the One Show, Type Directors Club, Print, HOW and Communication Arts.

== Bibliography ==
2021: Two Beats Ahead: What Musical Minds Teach Us About Innovation, with Panos Panay
