= Arne Halaas =

Norwegian computer scientist

- Born: September 20, 1943 (age 83)
- Known for: Fast Search & Transfer ASA
- Scientific career
- Fields: Computer Science, Telematics
- Workplaces: Norwegian University of Science and Technology, University of Kaiserslautern, Laboratoire d'Informatique, de Robotique et de Microélectronique de Montpellier

Arne Halaas (born 20 September 1943) is a Norwegian profiled Professor emeritus in computer technology and telematics at the Norwegian University of Science and Technology (NTNU). Halaas was central in the development of the technology that led to Fast Search & Transfer ASA (FAST), which was later acquired by Microsoft for NOK 6.6 billion (or approximately $1.2 billion U.S.) on April 24, 2008.

== Biography ==
Halaas was Head of the Computer and Information Department at the Norwegian University of Science and Technology in Trondheim from 1982 to 1984, and from 1993 to 1994.

From 1981 to 1982 he was a visiting professor at the University of Kaiserslautern in Kaiserslautern, Germany. From 1994 to 1995 he was a visiting professor at the Laboratoire d'Informatique, de Robotique et de Microélectronique de Montpellier (LIRMM) at the University of Montpellier in Montpellier, France.

Since 1981 Halaas has been working on special purpose search engines which has led to the cofounding of the three companies Turbit AS (1987), Fast Search & Transfer ASA (1997) and Interagon AS (2002). His research in algorithm construction and parallel computing was fundamental in the founding of the companies. Interagon specialized in complex search tasks for bioinformatics, and has developed a super-fast microprocessor, a so-called Patent Matching Chip (PMC), for searching biological data to find disease genes and develop new medicines. FAST later became a major global actor on search engines.

The acquisition of FAST has led to more than 1000 jobs in 25 different countries. In addition to making Trondheim Norway's search technology capital, as the acquisition has led several search companies, such as Yahoo!, Clustra, Microsoft and Google, to establish development departments in the city. His research has also led to collaborative solutions for more than 1 billion people in SharePoint and Office 365.

Halaas has since 1983 served on the editorial board of the VLSI Journal Integration and took part in establishing the International Federation for Information Processing (IFIP).

In 2012 he was awarded a Rosing Honorary Prize and in 2014 he received an honorary award from the Norwegian Academy of Technological Sciences.

== Literature ==
- (no) Publications by Arne Halaas in BIBSYS
