= Oslonett =

First ISP in Norway (founded 1991)

Oslonett was an Internet service provider based in Oslo, Norway, and the first ISP to serve Norway. It was established 12 of December 1991, founded by a group of 18 University of Oslo alumni (co founders include journalist and lector Gisle Hannemyr and Perl guru Gisle Aas). In 1993, the company set up Norway's first commercial website, www.oslonett.no. Kjell Øystein Arisland invited 15 others who became part owners by investing NOK 5,000 and one man-month in the coming year. Among those invited were Gisle Hannemyr, Tore Solvar Karlsen, Steinar Kjærnsrød, Yngvar Berg, Hans Petter Holen, Arne Kinnebergbraaten, Leif Arne Neset, Sigbjørn Næss, Otto Milvang, Erling Maartmann-Moe, and Tor Sverre Lande.

During the Winter Olympics in Lillehammer in 1994 – for the first time in history – the results were continuously posted on the web by Oslonett. In 1995, Oslonett received the Kvasir service, and the same year Oslonett was acquired by Schibsted. In the coming year, the environment built up Schibsted's internet offer SN Horisont, and in 1997, after Telenor bought all of Schibsted Netts subscribers, this was merged with Telenor's internet investment in the company Scandinavia Online (SOL).

In 2014, Oslonett was added as the first entry in digital form to the government funded archive known as "Norway's Document Heritage" (Norges Dokumentarv).
