= Open Music Initiative =

The Open Music Initiative is an initiative led by the Berklee College of Music Institute for Creative Entrepreneurship (BerkleeICE) in collaboration with the MIT Media Lab and with support from a number of major music labels, streaming services, publishers, collection societies and nearly 60 other founding entities. The mission of Open Music Initiative is to promote and advance the creation of open source standards and innovation related to music to help assure proper compensation for all creators, performers and rights holders of music.

== History ==
OMI was launched on June 13, 2016, by Berklee College of Music's Institute for Creative Entrepreneurship (ICE) in collaboration with the MIT Media Lab's Digital Currency Initiative. Founders include Berklee Institute for Creative Entrepreneurship and Sonicbids founder Panos Panay, technology entrepreneur Dan Harple, and designer and entrepreneur Michael Hendrix. The OMI working group includes researchers from University College London and the backing of major music labels such as Universal, Sony, and Warner, plus streaming services such as Spotify, Pandora Radio and YouTube.

OMI has stated that its goal is to establish a decentralized global platform using an open source framework to ensure that royalties will be directly administered to music rights holders, creators and artists. According to Panay, “We believe an open sourced platform around creative rights can yield an innovation dividend for creators and rights holders alike”.

The initiative is focused on driving the creation of digital methodologies for data collection, data reconciliation, and file formats. Operational, strategic, and technical guidance for OMI will be provided by design and consulting firm IDEO and Context Labs.

== Technology ==
According to Harple, OMI is not a database or a standard, but instead "an open-source technical architecture comprised of core functional blocks and APIs that will allow developers and stakeholders to build their own systems and tools that are OMI compliant”. Developers and stakeholders in one OMI compliant system could theoretically interoperate with other OMI compliant systems without giving up design or operational control. Harple said OMI compliance could also solve problems such as legacy rights management for older content.

Harple's Context Labs reportedly intends to "extend the work it’s done for the traditional publishing supply chain to music publishing" with a blockchain-enabled platform for OMI to help implement an "interoperable framework suitable for the transformative at-scale improvements the music industry so needs".

== Reception ==
Forbes writer Nelson Granados commented that "it looks like finally, the right group is coalescing to fix the music industry’s digital value chain" and noted, "coordinating powerful players like the top music labels will be no easy task, and disagreements are bound to arise. Getting members to commit and invest will be key, and hurdles will arise in the process. But with academics and industry getting together, there is a good chance OMI will finally solve the problem". Independent cellist and composer Zoe Keating commented in the Boston Globe that OMI could facilitate payment for smaller projects and encourage collaboration among artists, adding that “the lack of a public authoritative record of creation and ownership keeps coming down as one of the things that stops innovation in licensing from occurring. If that was one of the main outcomes of this project, that would be huge.”

== See also ==
- Analog hole
- DRM
- Secure Digital Music Initiative
