= Torleiv Maseng =

Norwegian engineer (1946–2023)

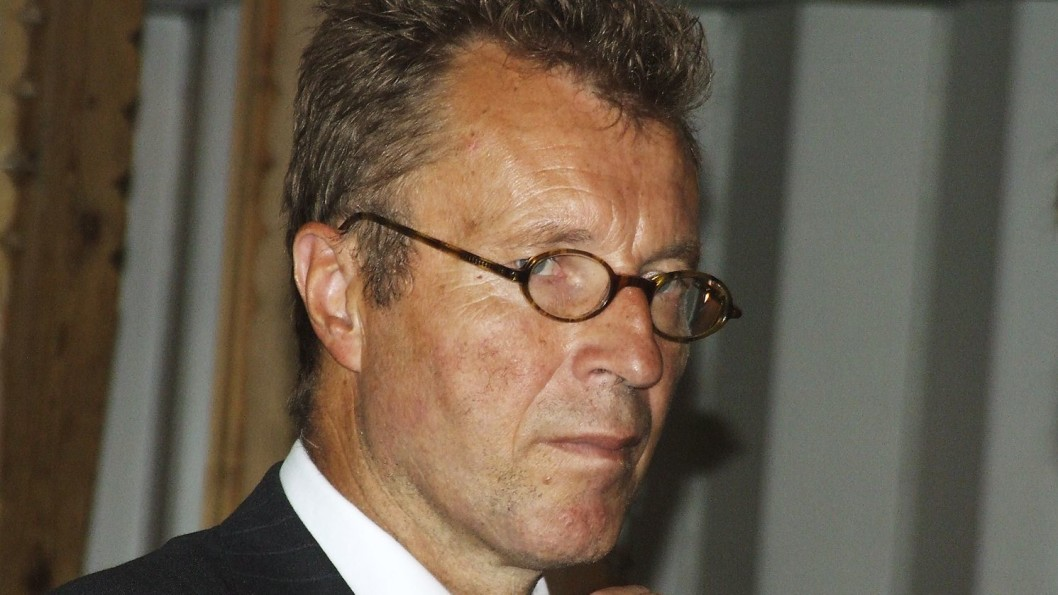
- Born: 24 December 1946; Stockholm, Sweden
- Died: 11 July 2023 (aged 76)
- Education: Norwegian University of Science and Technology (M.S.)
- Occupation: Engineer
- Notable work: Global System for Mobile Communications

Torleiv Maseng (24 December 1946 – 11 July 2023) was a Norwegian engineer, who made some contribution to the Global System for Mobile Communications project. His work included the standard use of channel estimation and the combination of equalization, error correcting codes and modulation in which the Viterbi algorithm was used by all components.

Maseng received his master's degree in Radio Communication from the Norwegian Institute of Technology in 1970. In July 1974 he joined SHAPE (Supreme Headquarters Allied Powers Europe) Technical Center in The Hague as a scientist in the Communications Division. He was responsible for the development of the NATO SATCOM Control system. He was also involved in operational planning for the NATO SATCOM system, e.g. frequency planning, power allocation, interference analysis and modem evaluation. He also participated in the production of specifications for procurement of new satellite ground terminals, computer systems and modems for NATO.

In 1982 he was employed by SINTEF where he was involved in the design and standardisation of the GSM project. In 1986, he received the SINTEF award for his work on modulation and coding. In 1992 he started NetCom GSM A/S with Trygve Tamburstuen and had the technical responsibility. NetCom is the second largest mobile phone operator in Norway now owned by Telia and in 2016 changed their name to Telia.

== Academic career ==
In October 1993, Maseng was appointed to a chair in Radio Technology at the University of Lund, Sweden. In January 1994 he started working as a professor at Department of Applied Electronics. Here he contributed to foundation of the Centre of Excellence of Circuit Design and a research program Personal Computing and Communication which is a national research program financed by the Foundation for Strategic Research.

Maseng later became a Director of Research at the Norwegian Defence Research Establishment. He also served as a professor at the University of Oslo/University Graduate Center (UNIK) since 2017 organized as a department of UiO, Department of Technology Systems and later at Department of Informatics.

== Death ==
Maseng died on 11 July 2023, at the age of 76.

== Works ==
Maseng was the author of more than 300 papers, held patents and has served as an editor of the IEEE Communications Magazine. He has been listed for the last several years in Marquis Who's Who in the world. He was a member of the Norwegian Academy of Technological Sciences. He received "Gulltasten 2010", an honorary award for his work in telecommunications. In 2012 he received Aftenpostens readers award for the most significant invention in Norway since 1980, for his work on GSM early development. In 2014 he got the Rosing Prize for the same effort.

- Telenor, Telektronikk no 3 2004 page 161-164
- Ericsson "Changing the World" by Svenolof Karlson and Anders Lugn, page 139. ISBN 9789170553943 in English and in Swedish ISBN 9789170553936.
