= NTENT =

Semantic search and natural language understanding technology company

- Formerly: Vertical Search Works
- Industry: Technology
- Founded: 2010
- Founders: Pat Condo; Colin Jeavons
- Headquarters: New York City, New York, United States
- Key people: Pat Condo (CEO); Ricardo Baeza-Yates (CTO)
- Website: ntent.com

NTENT is a semantic search and natural language understanding technology company based in New York City. It was founded in 2010 as a result of a merger between Convera Corporation and Firstlight ERA.

== History ==
NTENT was founded in February 2010 as the result of a merger between Convera Corporation and Firstlight ERA, with roots in semantic search and natural language processing technologies dating back to the early 1980s.

NTENT applied the contextual ad platform technology from Firstlight ERA to enter the advertising sector. Utilizing semantic analysis and advanced targeting capabilities, NTENT partnered with digital publishers, brands, and marketers Meredith Corporation, NBC, Scripps, and Viacom to launch a native, contextual ad platform that automatically matched advertisements to the concept of an article without the need of a complex keyword management, thereby providing end-users with a native advertising experience.

In June 2016, NTENT announced the expansion of its semantic search and natural language processing technologies, including support for the Russian language. This marked a key milestone for NTENT, whose core technology stack has evolved to include branches of Artificial Intelligence (AI) such as machine learning, knowledge representation and natural language understanding, to create a proprietary ontology with the ability to interpret taxonomic relationships and organize concepts regardless of language.

In the autumn of 2016, NTENT further widened its international presence by opening an office in Barcelona. The office operated as a Spanish private limited company. Allegedly due to the COVID-19 recession, all the Spanish office's employees were furloughed in the spring of 2020, and the office eventually went into liquidation.

In March 2021, NTENT's CEO Pat Condo founded a new company called Seekr Technologies. Since December 2021, NTENT website automatically redirects to Seekr News homepage.

=== Executive history ===
Co-founder Pat Condo is the company's CEO and Chairman. In July 2016, Ricardo Baeza-Yates was named as the company's CTO, having come from Yahoo! where he served as the Chief Research Scientist. He held the CTO position at NTENT until 2020.

== Technology ==
NTENT's platform uses semantic ranking and knowledge base technologies. The system applies semantic ranking algorithms across a lexicon and ontology using machine learning and natural language understanding. These technologies are used to disambiguate queries to detect user intention and provide results.
