= GyPSii =

Geosocial networking service provider

- Company type: Private
- Website type: Geosocial Networking
- Available in: English, Spanish and Chinese
- Founded: 2007
- Headquarters: Amsterdam, Netherlands
- Area served: Worldwide
- Owners: GeoSentric, OYJ
- Founders: Daniel Harple, Sam Critchley, Rich Pizzarro, John Drefahl, Gavin Nicol
- Website: Gypsii.com
- Launched: 2008
- Current status: Operated by Sina Weibo

GyPSii is a provider of geosocial networking applications and services for the iPhone, iPod, iPad, BlackBerry OS, Android, and Java-based phones, Symbian S60 and S40, Windows Mobile and MID notebooks. The company is headquartered in Amsterdam, Netherlands, with offices in Asia and the United States.

== History ==
According to co-founder Daniel Harple, while cycling around Amsterdam in 2007 searching for nearby restaurants with his mobile phone browser, he realized the need for a software application that would allow friends to easily track and share locations and activities with each other. The previous year Harple had met GyPSii's other founder, Sam Critchley, who had been working on a location-based mobile URL geolocation application, a2b, originally based on a database of restaurant and other landmark locations, since 2004, and which had launched and received some international press coverage in 2006. After meeting, Harple and Critchley came up with the idea for GyPSii whilst meeting in a café in Amsterdam and began to collaborate on the new service. Their application became the Amsterdam-based company, GeoSolutions BV, doing business as Gypsii. Shortly afterward, the resulting startup was acquired and merged to Finnish company Benefon, later known as GeoSentric OYJ, parent company of GeoSentric Group. At this time GyPSii received early press coverage noting the role positioning technologies would begin to play in mobile social networks.

GyPSii was launched in time for the 2008 Olympics in Beijing, where the app's real time blogging enabled event results, videos and pictures to be "broadcast" instantly via GyPSii. Shortly after its launch, Harple predicted GyPSii "could have more users in one year than Facebook had in three." GyPSii added about 1 million new users in China in the last quarter of 2009. By May 2010 the company reported it had reached over two million users, and in June 2010, added 130 million subscribers in Latin America as part of a deal with mobile operator Telefónica.

In 2009, GyPSii was a Webby Award winner in the Social Networking category.

In 2010 Sina Weibo entered into a joint venture with GeoSentric's GyPSii. Sina eventually took over operations of GyPSii services such as the Chinese language location-based mobile social networking application called WeilLngDi, as well as the location-based photo-sharing service similar to Instagram called TuDing.

In September 2010, Harple resigned as Executive Chairman and Group CEO, but continues as a major shareholder and lead inventor/patent-holder to GeoSentric and its technologies.

== Products ==
=== GyPSii ===
GyPSii's "social, local, mobile" application utilizes GPS to allow mobile device users to search for and identify their contacts locally or internationally and add a real time, location-based element to social networking. Compatible with other social networking sites, GyPSii allows location-specific functionality to be transferred to a user's Facebook page, showing their own location in relation to friends locations. GyPSii technology also lets users view blogs, news, events and social media content, filtered by location.

Mobile phone users can create user-generated content in real time using GyPSii, The GyPSii Application programming interface and resulting User Experience has been likened by company officials to "a window into the management of your social fabric and your interaction with people, not just on GyPSii but on other social networks." GyPSii's underlying database of user information can additionally be used to target advertising.

In October 2008, GyPSii's PlaceMe application, which lets users geotag photo, video, and audio recordings to be shared with friends, was given a Symbian Star Developer Award, as voted by Nokia subsidiary Navteq.

GyPSii's iPhone app was launched in 2009, allowing user-created places and experiences to become Internet-searchable destinations that are available for friends and communities to share and comment on, not only in GyPSii, but also across other social media such as Facebook and Twitter. China Unicom has also partnered with GyPSii, using its technology to bundle GyPSii on all iPhones in China and launch a China-based social networking application for the iPhone called Unispace.

=== OEx (Open Experience) ===
Launched in February 2009, the GyPSii OpenExperience API (OEx) is a platform as a service for incorporating location-based social networking functionality, location context, advertising, and user generated content into embedded mobile clients and 3rd party applications. The OEx API is the same platform on which GyPSii's own clients are built.

=== Tweetsii ===
In March 2010, GyPSii launched Tweetsii, a real time app for the iPhone, Android and BlackBerry platforms featuring user created tweets, images, reviews, comments, checkins, and tips with the ability to build an index of places, with updates from Twitter users and other location-based services including Gowalla and Foursquare.

=== WeiLingDi ===
In March 2011, GyPSii partnered with Chinese web portal Sina.com to launch WeiLingDi, a Chinese language location-based mobile social networking application that allows users to share their location and status, broadcast events and updates, find friends, and earn rewards points and badges. In 2011, analysts speculated that WeiLingDi could generate substantial income from advertising and data analysis services based on Sina's 100 million users.

=== TudingMe ===
Powered by GyPSii technology, TudingMe is a location-based social photography application that lets users personalize and share photos to Facebook, Twitter, Sina, Sohu, 163, Renren, Kaixin and QQ accounts. Features include 21 custom image filters, tagging and organizing of photos, and location auto-adding so users can find and interact with friends nearby. A China-specific Instagram-like photo-sharing version of the app is called "TuDing", which means ‘thumbtack’ in Chinese. With the release of a Windows phone 7 version, TuDing covers all major smartphone platforms including iOS, Android, Symbian and BlackBerry. The company reported more than 4 million users and uploads of over 6 million photos in December 2011.

== See also ==
- Symbian (S60) version comparison
