= Erling Maartmann-Moe =

Norwegian businessman (born 1952)

- Born: August 1, 1952 (age 74); Norway
- Education: University of Oslo
- Occupations: Businessman, venture capitalist

Erling Maartmann-Moe (born August 1, 1952) is a Norwegian businessman, venture capitalist, and author. He is a partner in Alliance Venture, a Norwegian venture firm, investing in early stage technology startups.

== Biography ==
Erling Maartmann-Moe was born on August 1, 1952 in Norway. He has a master's degree in computer science from the University of Oslo (1984) and was employed as a researcher and Research Director at the Norwegian Computing Centre from 1984 to 1996. He built and headed a Multimedia Group, and worked on early adaptions of sound and video in IP-based networks. He wrote the book Multimedia (Norwegian University Press) in 1991, which was revised for new editions in 1992 and 1994. He became a partner in the first commercial Internet company in Norway, Oslonett, in 1994. It was later sold to Schibsted and became the foundation for Scandinavia Online.

From 1995 to 2000 he was engaged as Technology Adviser at Four Seasons Venture (now Verdane Capital). In 1996 he became the CEO of New Media Science, a pioneering company in Norway, developing web-based services. When NMS merged with Digital Hverdag (1998) and later Cell Network (2000) he had the position of Director of Business Development.

In the fall of 2000 Maartmann-Moe attended the International Executive Programme at INSEAD in Paris. In 2001 he became the co-founder of Alliance Venture. He also contributed to commercialization of Research at Simula Innovation, and the University of Oslo, where the Technology Transfer Office Birkeland Innovasjon was founded (now Inven2) He became Partner in Alliance Venture in 2003, and has participated in raising two follow-up funds (2006 and 2014).

He has had a position as Adjunct Professor at the Center for Entrepreneurship at the University of Oslo since 2002

He lived and worked in Palo Alto, California in 2005–2006.

He has been a board member in several Norwegian companies, has several research publications, and has been active in the Norwegian startup community since the beginning of the 1990s.

== Books ==
- Multimedia (Norwegian University Press, 1991, 1992, 1995)
