= UNIK =

Research foundation at Kjeller in Norway

Coordinates: 59.9752°N 11.0445°E

The University Graduate Center (UNIK) was a research foundation at Kjeller in Norway up to 2016. University of Oslo tok over the operation from 1. January 2017. UNIK had four focus areas

- Network, Information Security and Signalprocessing for Communication,
- Electronics and Photonics
- Cybernetics and Industrial Mathematics
- Energy and the Environment

UNIK was founded in 1987 in order to foster the co-operation between the research institutes at Kjeller and to support master and PhD education. UNIK has a supplementary education as compared to the University of Oslo UiO and the Norwegian University of Science and Technology NTNU, which is based on the collaboration with the Research Institutes at Kjeller. The core founding members were FFI, IFE, Telenor R&I, and UiO. NTNU joined in 1995. Focus of UNIK is towards applications, thus the strong relation to the Institutes at Kjeller and other relevant industry.

UNIK's main cooperation partner was FFI and IFE. Telenor R&I, Kongsberg Defense Communications, Thales and Thrane Norway support education at UNIK through their staff members. In 2007 UNIK started together with IFE and the University College of Akershus (HiAk) a study within Energi and Environment.

UNIK is co-located with NORSAR at Kjeller close to Lillestrøm, 25 km east of Oslo. The building hosts the first termination of the ARPANET in Europe, back in 1973.

The start of the Internet in Europe and the mobile phone development is closely related to people teaching at UNIK:

- Pål Spilling, who brought the Internet to Europe
- Torleiv Maseng, who contributed to the development of GSM
- Øivind Kure, who influenced the research directions of Telenor as being research director and who was a partner in the Q2S center of excellency at NTNU

== UNIK's 25 anniversary ==
UNIK celebrated 25 years of higher academic education on Master and Phd level on 22. March 2012 . Vinton Cerf contributed with a video note mentioning the contribution of the people at Kjeller and UNIK in extending the ARPANET outside of the US.
