= Panos Panay (music executive) =

Cypriot-American entrepreneur

Panos A. Panay
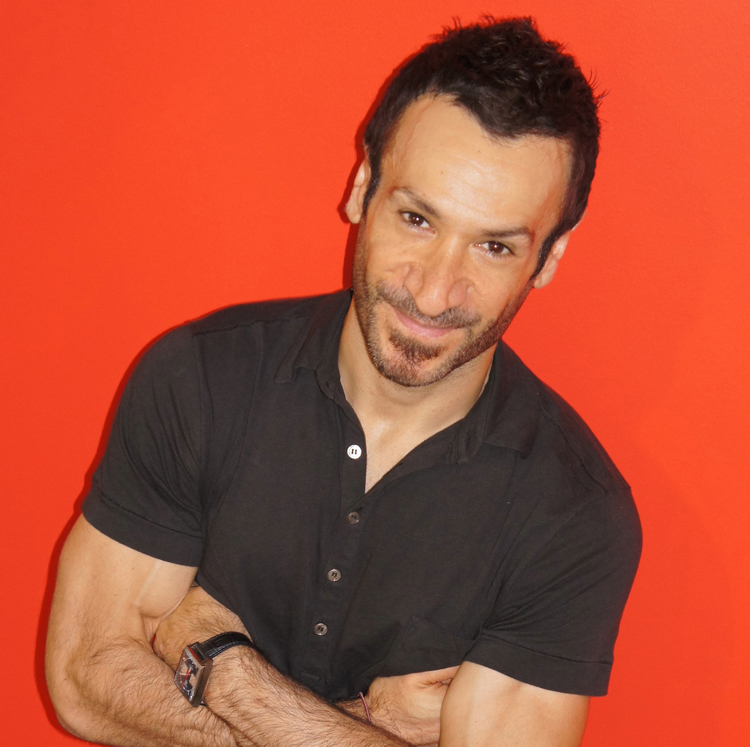
- Panos Panay portrait
- Born: 25 June 1972 (age 54); Cyprus
- Education: Berklee College of Music (BM Business Management), IE Business School/Brown University (Executive MBA Studies)
- Occupations: President, The Recording Academy/Grammy Awards
- Known for: SVP Global Strategy & Innovation Berklee School of Music, Founder & CEO of Sonicbids, Co-Founder Open Music Initiative, Founder, Berklee Institute for Creative Entrepreneurship
- Website: https://twobeatsahead.com/

Panos Andreas Panay (born Panayiotis Andreas Panayiotou; June 25, 1972) is a Cypriot-American media and music executive, entrepreneur, and author. Since 2022 he has been president of the Recording Academy, the organization that presents the Grammy Awards, having joined in 2021 as co-president and chief revenue officer.During his tenure Panay co-negotiated, as one of its principals, the Academy’s ten-year global media-rights agreement with The Walt Disney Company, under which the Grammy Awards telecast will move to ABC, Disney+, and Hulu beginning in 2027.

Earlier in his career, Panay founded the artist-booking platform Sonicbids, which he led from 2000 until its acquisition in 2013, and subsequently was senior vice president of global strategy and innovation at Berklee College of Music, where he established campuses in Abu Dhabi and New York City.

He is the co-author of Two Beats Ahead (2021), which examines innovation through the creative practices of musicians.

== Education ==
Panay has studied for an Executive MBA from IE Business School/Brown University and holds a Music Business & Management degree from Berklee College of Music, where he studied guitar with Lauren Passarelli.

== Career ==
=== Sonicbids and early career (1995–2013) ===
Before founding his own company, Panay worked as a talent agent at Ted Kurland Associates, booking international tours for jazz and other artists including Pat Metheny, Chick Corea, and Sonny Rollins.

In 2000 he founded Sonicbids, an online platform connecting musicians with promoters and event organizers. He was chief executive for thirteen years, growing the service to hundreds of thousands of registered artists, until it was acquired in 2013 by Backstage LLC, a company backed by Guggenheim Partners.

Berklee College of Music (2013–2021)

From 2013, Panay held several roles at Berklee College of Music, including founder and managing director of the Berklee Institute for Creative Entrepreneurship and, later, senior vice president of global strategy and innovation. He also co-founded the Open Music Initiative, a non-profit effort to develop an open protocol for identifying music-rights holders, in collaboration with the MIT Media Lab. In August 2019, Panay was named an MIT Connection Science Fellow.

=== Recording Academy (2021–present) ===
Panay joined the Recording Academy in June 2021 as co-president and chief revenue officer, alongside Valeisha Butterfield Jones, and became sole president in October 2022. As president, he has overseen the Academy’s commercial strategy, international expansion, and technology operations. In 2024 the Academy announced a ten-year global media-rights agreement with The Walt Disney Company, which Panay co-negotiated as one of the deal’s principals; under the agreement, the Grammy Awards telecast moves from CBS to ABC, with streaming on Disney+ and Hulu, beginning with the 2027 ceremony. He also led an international expansion of the Academy across Africa, the Middle East, and Asia, including licensing and cultural initiatives announced in 2024. During his tenure at the Recording Academy, Panos Panay oversaw an improvement in the organization's financial performance, including increased revenue and a shift from an operating loss to an operating profit. Panay established a separate commercial entity to manage and monetize the Recording Academy’s intellectual property, attracting interest from private-equity firms and assembling a board that included Indra Nooyi and Roger Brown. Panay's work included engagements involving FIFA's 2026 FIFA World Cup, the United Nations Human Rights Council, and commercial partnerships with The Coca-Cola Company, IBM, Mastercard, and MGM Resorts International. Panay led the establishment of campuses in Abu Dhabi and New York City, oversaw the Valencia campus in Spain, conducted negotiations for a campus in Shenzhen, China, secured funding, and led an institutional collaboration with the Massachusetts Institute of Technology (MIT).

== Writing and speaking ==
Panay has written about startups and entrepreneurship for blogs and publications including Huffington Post, Forbes, Entrepreneur, WSJ Accelerators and Fast Company. He has spoken at a TEDx event. He also spoke in the podcast Shaping Business Minds Through Art.

In 2021, Panay and R. Michael Hendrix, global design director at IDEO, co-wrote and published Two Beats Ahead (PublicAffairs, US and Penguin Business, UK), a book that covers what the musical mind has to teach about innovation, featuring interviews with top creatives including Pharrell Williams, Justin Timberlake, Gloria Estefan, Imogen Heap, Radiohead, T Bone Burnett, Hank Shocklee (co-founder of Public Enemy), and Jimmy Iovine. The book was selected by The Financial Times as Business Book of the Month in April 2021, featured in Harvard Business Review's IdeaCast, Talks at Google, Rebel Radio, and BBC Weekend.

Panay has guest-written articles on entrepreneurship for Forbes, BusinessWeek, Fast Company, and Inc. Magazine.

== Awards and honors ==
Panay was awarded the Fast Company's "Fast 50" honor, Mass Hi-Tech All Stars, Boston Business Journal's "40 under 40", Boston Globe's Game Changers of 2017, and BosInno "50 on Fire" Award for excellence in education. In April 2021, Panay’s book Two Beats Ahead: What Musical Minds Teach Us About Innovation, co-authored with R. Michael Hendrix, was featured as a Financial Times Business Book of the Month. He has spoken at international events, including the World Economic Forum in Davos, South by Southwest and Web Summit. On 26 September 2025, he received a Lifetime Achievement Award from the Federation of Cypriot American Organizations, followed by the Diaspora Ambassador Legacy Award at the CYDIA Awards in Cyprus on 9 May 2026.

== Personal life ==
Panay lives with his wife, Kimberly, and twin daughters in Los Angeles, California.
