= Microsoft Development Center Norway =

Software company based in Oslo, Norway

FAST, a Microsoft Subsidiary
- Industry: Information Technology
- Founded: July 16, 1997; 29 years ago
- Defunct: 2008
- Fate: Acquired by Microsoft
- Headquarters: Oslo, Norway
- Area served: Global
- Key people: John M. Lervik (Former CEO), Bjørn Olstad (CTO)
- Products: Search engines, enterprise search, information access, knowledge management
- Number of employees: 750
- Parent: Microsoft
- Website: www.fastsearch.com

Microsoft Development Center Norway (formerly Fast Search & Transfer ASA (FAST)) is a Norwegian company. Before its acquisition by Microsoft in 2008, FAST developed search-engine software for large enterprises. It continued as Microsoft Development Center Norway from 2010.

== Technology ==
=== Products ===
FAST developed the enterprise-search platform FAST ESP, as well as applications for online advertising, data cleansing, e-commerce, and business intelligence.

=== Technology Ownership ===
FAST used complementary technologies from BBN Technologies for speech recognition and Stellent (now part of Oracle) for the conversion of different file formats. In 2007, FAST was sued by a company which claims that FAST, as well as Google, Yahoo, Facebook and other major web companies, stole its technology.

=== Research Projects ===
==== Information Access Disruptions ====
Information Access Disruptions (IAD) was a research centre funded by the Research Council of Norway and its partners. FAST was the host institution, and the centre's research manager was Bjørn Olstad, an adjunct professor at the Norwegian University of Science and Technology (NTNU) and FAST's chief technology officer.

Its Norwegian partners included the Norwegian University of Science and Technology, the University of Oslo, the University of Tromsø, the Norwegian School of Management, Schibsted, and Accenture. Its international partners included Cornell University, University College Dublin, and Dublin City University.

==== PHAROS ====
The European Commission funded the research project “The Platform for Search of Audiovisual Resources Across Online Spaces” (PHAROS).

== History ==
=== 1997–1999: Development ===
FAST was formed in 1997 as a spin-off from the technology company Opticom, with John Markus Lervik as its leader. The company originated in the IT environment at NTNU. Professor Arne Halaas at NTNU was a substantial contributor in the early days of FAST. John M. Lervik, a student from NTNU, was one of the first employees at FAST. He took his doctorate under the supervision of Professor Tor A. Ramstad and eventually became the company's CEO, until January 2009.

During 1998 and 1999, FAST announced strategic alliances with Lycos, Dell and TIBCO, and the first commercial launch of products took place in 1999.

=== 2000–2003: Commercialization ===
During 2000, FAST announced several new European and US customers and partners. The company's IPO took place in June 2001, and FAST is publicly traded on the main board of the Oslo Stock Exchange (OSE) under the ticker symbol 'FAST'. The company continued over the next couple of years to announce new contracts with customers and partners such as eBay, IBM, BEA, Microsoft, Telus, Elsevier, and Broadvision. FAST was ranked number three on the 2002 Deloitte Technology Fast 500, a ranking of the 500 fastest-growing technology companies in Europe.

In 2003, FAST decided to focus on enterprise search, and sells their Internet division, including FAST Web Search, FAST Partner Site and AlltheWeb.com, to Overture Services, Inc. (later acquired by Yahoo!).

=== 2004–2007: Expansion ===
In January 2004, FAST introduced the FAST Enterprise Search Platform (FAST ESP.) to the market. During the following three years, FAST expanded its geographical reach by opening new offices in Asia, Middle East, Latin America and Africa, extended its partnership relations through the introduction of the FAST X10 partner program, and introduced new solutions aimed specifically at certain business areas, like FAST Impulse for eCommerce and FAST Advisor for Internet yellow pages and portals.

The company was for the first time placed in the Leader's Quadrant of the Gartner Magic Quadrant for Information Access Technology in 2004, and stayed in the Leader's Quadrant over the next years as well. The company almost quadrupled its revenues from 2003 (US$42M) to 2006 ($162M).

FAST acquired Convera's RetrievalWare in August 2007 for US$23 million (~$33.4 million in 2024).

Fast's Q4 2007 Intra-quarterly update gave enterprise as 30% of its business (page 17). With Q3 2007 enterprise license revenues of less than $4M (~$5.81 million in 2024), it was one of the less significant players in enterprise search market.

=== Late 2007 Decline ===
On 30 July 2007, FAST announced a reduction in revenue of 40% due to changes in financial controls on revenue recognition. It had been forecasting US$55M of Q2 2007 revenue and profitability; in a statement on the company's website, it revealed revenue would be reduced to US$35M and it would be unprofitable. According to the company it had been recognizing revenue without signed contracts using Memoranda of Understanding. The shares fell 28% to hit a three-year low.

That, along with problems with lack of customer payment, was raised by Goldman Sachs in a report, written in June 2007 by Moawalla. Finansavisen newspaper on August 6, 2007, ran an article entitled "FAST under investigation again" reporting on an ongoing investigation by the unit of The Financial Supervisory Authority of Norway (Kredittilsynet) that oversees all listed companies’ financial reporting. On August 8 the company reported actual Q2 2007 numbers with revenue of US$34.1M (license sales down 41% sequentially and 24% y on y) and operating loss of US$38M. As a result of this, the company has announced that it will implement a layoff program of 20% of all staff, reducing the quarterly operational cost base in excess of US$12M, as it tries to return to profitability. It expects to be unprofitable until 2008.

On 5 September 2007, FAST signed a deal with The Walt Disney Company's Parks and Resorts Online for the Fast Enterprise Search Platform, including software licenses, maintenance fees and other services. On 7 September, FAST informed investors in its quarterly update that the predicted losses for Q3 would rise again to over $60M, and that the company would be concentrating its remaining resources on the "monetization" or ad serving business managed by their Ad Momentum platform. The downplaying of those older functions and concentration on the new market area was welcomed by financial markets.

=== Q3 2007 Results ===
FAST received a further blow when a major customer, Schibsted, said it had made a too-risky decision in choosing to implement its own web search engine and was changing its strategy.

Investors and customers were hoping that, to reverse the slide, the company would announce new accounting and quality controls in its Q3 report. However, on 30 October, FAST reported a loss of $100M in the quarter (up from the anticipated $60M loss), with another collapse of license revenue, down 55% year on year, resulting in a significant loss of software market share. The operation of the company as a software company rather than a services company was accompanied by its gross margin falling to 67% from 83% a year earlier. The problems with the non-payment of bills by customers continued, with $26M of debt being written off.

=== Board of Directors ===
The conduct of FAST's directors was the subject of much comment in Norway, with one director resigning and another making public statements about other directors and major shareholders. FAST board member, Robert Keith, told the newspaper Finansavisen: "I ought to have seen the problems in FAST earlier. And I ought to have understood that Hans Gude Gudesen is a crazy liar. Also, I ought have shot Oystein Stray Spetalen the first time I met him. That would have helped a lot of people." Spetalen and Hans Gude Gudesen were both major shareholders in FAST. Furthermore, directors Keith and Fussel were allegedly being pursued by the Norwegian tax authorities for US$50M in unpaid taxes. In the event of non-payment, there was concern that liability might fall on the company.

The ongoing turmoil saw three directors resign from the board, the last being Johan Fredrik Odfjell, who was quoted in the company's release as saying: "FAST faces many challenges and opportunities going forward".

On 22 December, Orkla, FAST's largest shareholder, demanded an extraordinary general meeting to force Fussel and Keith off the board.

=== Need to Restate Accounts for 2006 and 2007 ===
On 12 December 2007, the Oslo Stock Exchange suspended trading of FAST shares. The next morning, the company announced it was reviewing the accounts both for 2006 and the preliminary results for 2007, with the likely outcome that the results would be changed. In an article entitled "Fast restates its accounts", www.dagensit.no reported that FAST's results for 2006 and 2007 might be revised, in what it called "another clean up round." It also stated: "The Search technology vendor Fast Search & Transfer have had several rounds with restating of accounts." Some months after CFO Joseph Lacson declared that “everything is cleaned up”, there seemed to be skeletons in the closet. Wednesday afternoon trading was suspended after what the stock exchange called “certain conditions”. The shares fell around 7% on the news.

=== Microsoft Acquisition ===
On 8 January 2008, it was announced that the board of FAST had unanimously accepted a $1.2 billion takeover offer from Microsoft. Microsoft had secured the backing of FAST's two largest institutional shareholders, Orkla and Hermes Focus Asset Management Europe. As of 24 April 2008, 97.37% of all FAST shares were controlled by MACS Holdings Limited, a wholly owned subsidiary of Microsoft Corp. The stock was de-listed from Oslo Stock Exchange 16 May 2008.

On 26 November 2008, it was reported that FAST Search had laid off 25 employees as a result of the acquisition by Microsoft.

As more information came to light about the major readjustment of the accounts, it was reported that Microsoft might not have completed its due diligence adequately.

On 2 December 2009, Microsoft sold FAST's Folio and NXT businesses to Rocket Software. The complementary products were application suites used by businesses to publish and index reference material onto discs, network workstations, and online.

== Criminal Investigation ==
On 24 May 2008, Norwegian news website E24.no reported that the Financial Supervisory Authority of Norway had asked police to investigate anomalies it had uncovered in the FAST accounts. On 13 October 2008, Norwegian Økokrim raided FAST's offices in Oslo.

Under scrutiny by the Norwegian police for possible fraudulent behavior prior to the FAST acquisition by Microsoft, former founder and CEO, John Lervik, resigned from the wholly owned Microsoft subsidiary on 23 January 2009. CTO and Microsoft Distinguished Engineer, Bjørn Olstad, then assumed Lervik's duties as the head of Microsoft's Enterprise Search Group.

== See also ==
- Ezmo
