= Search Technologies =

Search Technologies Corp.
- Type: Private
- Industry: Information technology; Information access
- Founded: 2005
- Founder: Kamran Khan; John Steinhauer; Dennis Tran
- Headquarters: Herndon, VA, United States
- Key people: Kamran Khan (CEO); John Steinhauer (VP); Dennis Tran (VP); Paul Nelson (Chief Architect)
- Website: searchtechnologies.com

Search Technologies was a privately held IT services company whose main business involved search engines, big data, consulting and implementation services. The company specialized in a range of search engines including Microsoft SharePoint, the Google Search Appliance, Elasticsearch, Amazon Cloudsearch, Cloudera, and Apache Solr. Search Technologies provided services including experts-for-hire to managed services. The company was headquartered in Washington DC's Dulles Technology Corridor and had offices in Costa Rica, California, Kentucky, the UK, Germany and the Czech Republic.

In August 2017, Search Technologies was acquired by Accenture.

== History ==
Search Technologies was founded in 2005 by three former executives of search engine software companies, Kamran Khan (CEO), John Steinhauer (VP technology) and Dennis Tran (VP Sales), all of whom remain employees of the company.

In 2008, Search Technologies recruited Paul Nelson, a pioneer in the search engine industry since 1989 and the original author of RetrievalWare. Paul Nelson is currently Chief Architect at Search Technologies, and a minority shareholder in the company.

In August 2017, Search Technologies was acquired by Accenture for an undisclosed amount.

In February 2021, Accenture completed the integration of Search Technologies into Accenture Applied Intelligence. The original Search Technologies website (www.searchtechnologies.com) was shut down and redirected to page on Accenture.com. Some of the founding executives of Search Technologies have since started a new company.

== Growth ==
Prior to acquisition, Search Technologies served various markets including media & entertainment, publishers, government, and consumer products & services. Their customers include Booz Allen Hamilton, Library of Congress, Lenovo, U.S. Government Printing Office, and Unilever.

In December 2009, Search Technologies acquired InfoSolutions Inc., a Cincinnati-based company also focused on search engines.

In January 2015, Search Technologies acquired a Prague-based provider of enterprise search.

In August 2017, Accenture acquired Search Technologies for an undisclosed amount.

== Awards ==
Search Technologies has been a Microsoft GOLD certified partner since 2008, with specific competencies in Search and Digital Marketing. The company is also a certified Google Enterprise Partner, a worldwide implementation partner of Elastic, and Cloudera, and has been listed in KMWorld's "100 Companies that Matter in Knowledge Management" since 2007. More recently, Search Technologies was honored as one of Virginia's Fastest Fifty companies, based on growth over the last three years.

In 2011 Search Technologies was named to the Washington Business Journal's "List of Top 20 Small Technology Companies"

Search Technologies was named Google Enterprise North American Innovation Partner of the Year in February 2013.
