= Future School =

Canadian school

Location
- 7191 Yonge Street; Markham, Ontario, L3T 0C4; Canada; 43°48′13″N 79°25′15″W

Information
- Former name: Netskills College; FutureSkills High School
- School type: Private
- Established: 1997
- Principal: Hassan Mirzai
- Enrollment: 165 (as of September 2015)
- Campus: Urban
- Website: www.futureschool.org

Future School is a co-educational independent school in Toronto, Ontario, Canada. Established in 1997, the school was previously known as Netskills College and FutureSkills High School, before adopting its current name.

== History ==
The school was established in 1997 in Toronto, under the name Netskills College, with a focus on computer courses. In 2002, the name was changed to FutureSkills High School to reflect the addition of high school credit courses to the curriculum. On December 5, 2016, FutureSkills High School lost its credit-granting authority. The school was then re-branded as Future School in 2017.

== Academics ==
The school offers credit courses for students in grades 9 to 12 who are working towards an Ontario Secondary School Diploma (OSSD). The school has no age limit policy; adult students can join the school to complete their high school diplomas. Courses are provided in full-time or part-time formats, through day school, night school and summer school programs. Various fast-track classes and distance learning versions of standard programs are available to mature students or others who are unable to attend all the classes in person.

Approximately one third of the student body are international students, who can choose from a range of ESL courses (ESLAO, ESLBO, ESLCO, ESLDO, ESLEO). International students can also take the TOEFL or IELTS exam at their premises.

The basic fee for one year of tuition at Future School is $14,500 for international secondary school students and $8850 for local high school students.
