= Convera Corporation =

American software company

Convera
- Type: Private
- Industry: Internet, computer software
- Founded: 2001
- Headquarters: Vienna, VA, United States
- Key people: Patrick C. Condo, President and CEO; Ronald J. Whittier , Chairman of Board; Matthew G. Jones, CFO
- Revenue: ▲1.3 million USD (2009)
- Net income: ▼23 million USD (2009)
- Number of employees: 32
- Website: ntent.com

Convera was a private software company, headquartered in Virginia, which operated from 2001 through 2010. The company was formed in December 2000 by the merger of Intel's Interactive Services division and Excalibur Technologies Corporation. Until 2007, Convera's primary focus was the enterprise search market through its flagship product, RetrievalWare, which is widely used within the secure government sector in the United States, UK, Canada and other countries. Convera sold its enterprise search business to FAST Search & Transfer in August 2007 for $23 million, at which point RetrievalWare was officially retired. Microsoft Corporation continues to maintain RetrievalWare for its existing customer base.

In February 2010, Convera Corporation merged with Firstlight ERA to become NTENT, bringing with it its web-scale semantic search engine.

== History ==
Excalibur Technologies had a history of search technology development dating back to the early 1980s. Founded by Jim Dowe in February 1980, Excalibur sought to exploit neural networks through its proprietary Adaptive Pattern Recognition Processing (APRP). In 1985, the Company entered into a multiyear research, development and royalty contract with Nikkei Information Systems Co., Ltd. ("NIS"), a Japanese company. For the Japanese market, Excalibur packaged the technology for broader adoption. Dowe presented TICOL: A Development Tool For Fifth Generation Programming Environments along with Mr. Toshi Arai of NIS at the 1988 Forth Conference on Programming Environments. The conference was hosted by the College of Engineering and Applied Science at the University of Rochester. In parallel, Excalibur demonstrated several successful applications of APRP pattern matching using multimedia data types (including text data, signal data, and video data) and packaged these as TRS, SRS and VRS targeted to US government agencies. One of those early applications of APRP for text retrieval proved that pattern matching search tolerated spelling variations and optical character recognition (OCR) processing errors over large volumes of scanned/OCR material. This led to the release of Excalibur EFS for electronic filing and search.

Digital Equipment Corporation (DEC) began distributing the Excalibur products in 1990. Pat Condo represented DEC in the transaction and later joined Excalibur and began to package the technology behind the applications into a server-based offering. In 1995, Condo was named President/CEO. That same year Excalibur acquired Conquest for its scalable, distributed software architecture and renamed the product to RetrievalWare. The acquisition provided real-time profiling, Boolean search, statistical and heuristic search, natural language query, semantic network tools, knowledge bases, and a complete set of application development tools. On May 5, 1997, the company acquired Interpix Software Corporation ("Interpix") located in Santa Clara, California, a privately owned company and developer of a commercial technology enabling the collection, indexing, management and presentation of multimedia data on the Internet and corporate intranets.

Condo continued to architect and build out a complete multimedia/semantic, software as a service search platform, partnering with Ronald J. Whittier, head of Intel's interactive media division. On December 21, 2000, those efforts resulted in the merger of Excalibur and Intel's Interactive Media Services division to form Convera Corporation and Whittier left Intel to join Convera as chairman. As part of that transaction, Convera was assigned Intel's contract with the National Basketball Association to develop and distribute interactive NBA content, including enhanced broadband programming and interactive game broadcasts.

On March 7, 2002, Convera acquired Semantix Inc., a private software technology development company specializing in cross-lingual processing and computational linguistics technology. Later that year, on August 1, 2002, Condo hired Dr. Claude Vogel, founder and Chief Technology Officer of Semio Corporation. Vogel, as Convera CTO, drove the development of the new categorization and dynamic classification capabilities while bolstering the extensive search and discovery strengths of the platform, including facets and a multi-million term ontology. In a December 3, 2004, article in The Washington Post, Condo disclosed the company's strategy to apply the technology built for the intelligence community to an advanced development project to index the Web.

== Services ==
Convera Corporation provided software as a service (SaaS) vertical search services to publishers and other media companies. Publishers used the web search platform to create customized search experiences for specialist audiences. Convera's vertical search service was used by many of the leading publishing companies, including John Wiley & Sons., Centaur Media, Incisive Media, Lebhar-Friedman and Advanstar. Vertical search applications were usually presented under the publisher's brand and typically combined a mixture of public web data (selected by the publisher as being the best public content available on the subject), the publisher's proprietary content and private content provided by third parties.

== Shareholders ==
A controlling interest in Convera was held by Allen & Company, a New York based investment bank. Allen & Company has been associated with Convera since its foundation in 2000 and was also a major shareholder in Excalibur Technologies for many years. Legg Mason Opportunity Trust also had a sizable holding. Donald McCauley and John Yauch maintained a large but minority share of the company. They were two of the most vocal backers, often referring to the company as a "coiled spring."

== NTENT ==
After the merger with Firstlight ERA in February 2010, Convera's remaining assets and technology became the property of NTENT. NTENT continues to provide web-scale semantic search for vertical applications, and also provides context-sensitive advertising services for both web pages and search results.
