= Lexin =

Lexin is an online Swedish and Norwegian lexicon that can translate between Swedish or Norwegian and a number of other languages. Its original use was to help immigrants translate between their native languages and Swedish, but at least the English-Swedish-English lexicons are so complete that many Swedes use them for everyday use.

The dictionary is a collaboration between the Institute for Language and Folklore and the Royal Institute of Technology.

== Swedish ==
The Swedish lexicons are now called Folkets lexikon (The People's Dictionary) and support bidirectional translation between Swedish and:

- Albanian
- Arabic
- Bosnian
- Croatian
- English
- Finnish
- Greek
- Kurdish (Kurmanji & Sorani)
- Russian
- Serbian
- Somali
- Spanish
- Turkish
