= Daniel Harple =

American businessman (born 1959)

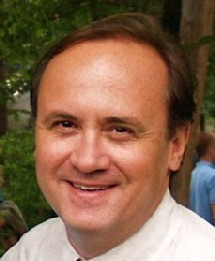
- Born: July 23, 1959 (age 67)
- Education: University of Rhode Island, Massachusetts Institute of Technology
- Occupations: CEO, Technology entrepreneur, investor, and engineer
- Known for: Real Time Streaming Protocol, VoIP, location-based social networking, blockchain technologies

Daniel Harple (born July 23, 1959) is an American entrepreneur, investor, inventor, and engineer best known for his role in the creation of several Internet standards, among them, Real Time Streaming Protocol used in entertainment and communications systems such as YouTube, RealPlayer, QuickTime, Skype, and others. Harple has been called a visionary, an Internet pioneer, and a "serial entrepreneur", founding multiple technology start-ups and playing a key role in the development of technologies like collaborative groupware, Voice over IP, and interactive screen sharing whiteboards. Harple also holds a number of core technology patents for inventions in VoIP, media streaming, real time web communications, collaborative computing, and location-based social media.

He was co-founder, chairman and CEO of InSoft, Inc. which was merged with Netscape in 1996. He was also a co-founder of enterprise content integration technology provider, Context Media that was sold to Oracle Corporation in 2005. In 2007, he co-founded the location-based social network application provider, GeoSolutions, B.V. doing business as GyPSii. He is currently CEO and managing director of Amsterdam-based Shamrock Ventures BV.

== Education and early life ==
A Rhode Island native, Harple performed as a teenage guitarist in garage rock bands during the 1970s, admittedly fascinated by his band's various electronic equipment and the connections between it. He studied Liberal Arts at Marlboro College from 1977 to 1981, and received Bachelor's degrees in Psychology and Mechanical engineering from the University of Rhode Island in 1982 and 1986, where he also completed graduate-level work. He also holds the M.Sc degree from MIT. Focusing on computer networking, he worked with the U.S. Department of Defense at the Naval Underwater Systems Center in the early 1980s, and later at companies such as AMP Incorporated and Ingersoll-Rand, where he became interested in applying principles of ergonomics to computer communications technology user interfaces in order to make it easy and convenient for the user.

== Influence ==
As both the creator of technology that became the backbone of multimedia and real-time interactive communication, and founder a number of influential, venture-backed technology start-ups, Harple has been called a visionary, an Internet pioneer in real time interactive communications, and a "serial entrepreneur". According to co-founder of Vonage, Jeff Pulver, "If you use Skype, GoToMeeting or YouTube, among others, Harple's technology and its influence has touched your life."

Harple's founding of Context Media influenced Enterprise Content Integration. Context Media tackled the big data problem by building technologies to search, connect, and display content across large extended enterprises. The extensive of use of metadata was deployed in this effort, which also resulted in an invention and subsequent patent by Harple in this area of collaborative real-time computing. Context Media was seen as the leader in the segment and subsequently acquired by Oracle, while the company's main competitor, Charlotte, North Carolina-based Venetica was later acquired by IBM.

Harple also championed a new dimension of the social media phenomenon: individually customizable, highly mobile, location-based experiences. "Rather than sitting indoors chatting to friends on an PC-based service - you can be out and about seeing who is nearby, what they are doing and where you could go - all in real time", he commented. An early developer, investor, and advocate of mobile social networking technology, he saw it growing faster outside of the US, telling The New York Times in 2008, "I moved to Europe because I thought the U.S. venture capital community -- which I was a part of -- was myopic," he said. "They can't see the global significance of what is happening."

== Career ==
=== InSoft ===
In 1992, Harple co-founded InSoft with partner Richard Pizzarro. The Grantham, Pennsylvania company was a provider of distributed digital video solutions, desktop conferencing and videoconferencing applications. The Internet media streaming, telephony and collaborative applications originated by InSoft laid the foundation for development of the Real Time Streaming Protocol (RTSP) standard.

InSoft merged with Netscape in 1996, for a value of $161 million. A chapter in former The Wall Street Journal columnist Tom Petzinger's book, "The New Pioneers: The Men and Women Who Are Transforming the Workplace and Marketplace," is devoted to the story of InSoft during the early days of the Internet.

=== Netscape ===
Following the merger of Insoft, Harple served as senior vice president at Netscape. Harple's team used the collaborative computing and streaming media technologies created at InSoft as the basis for new Netscape products such as LiveAudio and LiveVideo. These efforts led to the creation of a number of internet standards, including Real-Time Streaming Protocol (RTSP).

Netscape integrated a number of products initially developed by InSoft, including the first streaming media system called Netscape Media Server, the first Internet telephony technology called Netscape Conference, and the first media developers' platform called Netscape LiveMedia, as well as Netscape CoolTalk which was built on an early version of InSoft's shared whiteboard application.

=== Context Media ===
Harple founded Context Media in 1999, and described the company's goal to "create a fundamentally different way to matrix and share content between sites, and enable a new form of content commerce -- one where sites can become their own hubs of syndication and create content relationships based on context." The company won numerous industry awards. Products like Interchange Suite 3.0 allowed distributed and disparate digital asset and content repositories to remain distributed, while giving users a single, unified way to access the content the repositories contained. During this period computer scientist Andries van Dam served as chairman of the company's technical advisory board, working with Harple to develop standards-based protocols that would give Interchange Suite users the ability to seamlessly interact with and manipulate content stored in differing locations by differing applications.

Harple served as president and CEO of Context Media until the company was sold to Oracle Corporation in 2005. Context Media's content-integration software formed the basis of Oracle's collaborative search middleware product Fusion, that added content-management capabilities to application product lines.

=== Context Labs ===
In the mid-1990s, Harple became friends with songwriter and record producer Todd Rundgren, with whom he co-founded Context Labs, a media research company focused on exploring and developing new technologies intended to enhance and converge traditional media delivery systems for audio, video and music with the web. The company's name echoed Rundgren's and Harple's vision of "recontextualizing" the Internet by developing tools and products that helped process the vast amount of knowledge contained in it, "putting it into a context that derives the most meaning to each of us as individuals."

Harple worked with Rundgren on many projects. Patronet embodied Harple's goal of a more personalized Internet experience where users could combine different parts of an artist or band's web presence, such as video clips, band news or songs, to create an individualized context meaningful to them. Harple's research and experience with Patronet and Context Labs led him to subsequently found Context Media. Some time later in 2004, Harple acquired the pyramid stage set from Rundgren's 1976 Ra (Utopia album) tour and installed it as a sculpture in a natural setting in coastal Massachusetts.

=== GeoSolutions BV ===
In 2006, Harple moved to the Netherlands, where he co-founded GeoSolutions, B.V. (doing business as GyPSii), an Amsterdam-based company whose location-based social networking technology gained adoption through telecom companies in Asia, Europe and Latin America. GyPSii was designed so that carriers could choose to either install a GyPSii app on mobile devices or use GyPSii technology to build customized applications. Harple and co-founder Sam Critchley are credited with the initial creation of GyPSii. The resulting startup was acquired and merged by GeoSentric OYJ, a NASDAQ-listed company in Finland, where Harple subsequently assumed the role of executive chairman and group CEO. In September 2010, Harple resigned from this role to pursue personal and professional activities with Shamrock Ventures, B.V. He continues as a major shareholder and lead inventor/patent-holder to GeoSentric and its technologies.

==== GyPSii ====
Launched by Harple in 2008, GyPSii's "social, local, mobile" application utilizes GPS to allow mobile device users to search and identify contacts locally or internationally and add a real time, location-based element to social networking. By May, 2010 GyPSii reported it reached over two million users in its first year. GyPSii allows mobile phone users to create user-generated content in real time. In March 2010, GyPSii launched Tweetsii, a real time app for the iPhone, Android and BlackBerry platforms.

Prior to Harple's departure, GyPSii oversaw a joint venture with China's Sina.com to embed GyPSii technology at a platform level in its Twitter-like microblog, Weibo. China Unicom also partnered with GyPSii, using its technology to bundle GyPSii on all iPhones in China and launch a China-based social networking application for the iPhone called Unispace.

==== Shamrock Ventures BV ====
Harple is currently CEO and managing director of Shamrock Ventures BV in Amsterdam, offering strategic guidance to entrepreneurs to structure, start, and navigate companies from inception to liquidity events.

==== Context Labs, BV ====
In 2013, Harple established Context Labs, BV (CXL) based in Cambridge, Massachusetts and Amsterdam, the Netherlands. According to the company, it offers enterprise grade platform solutions that assist in the development of new market channels and reducing channel friction, while retaining and growing direct customer relationships. Based in part on Harple's work at MIT Sloan and the MIT Media Lab concentrating on "innovation dynamics" that resulted in a platform called InnovationScope, which functions to identify and describe innovation and its contributing components, the company's offerings are focused on the integration of secure distributed and shared ledgers (Blockchain), network graph analytics and visualizations, data interoperability, trusted identity management, and micro-payment enablement. The company's platform product line includes Chainplate Foundation, Snapshackle Interoperability, and VUEGraph Analytics.

Partnering with architectural design firm Rogers Partners in 2014, the company utilized innovation dynamics methods to collaborate on design for the Connect Kendall Square project. In 2016, R. R. Donnelley & Sons announced it would partner with the company to develop blockchain-enabled technology solutions for its publishing customers.

=== Innovation for Jobs (i4j) ===
Harple is co-chair of the Analytics Special Interest Group for i4j, a think tank founded by internet pioneer Vint Cerf and David Nordfors focused on potential strategies to transform the future of work in the internet economy. He has been an invited speaker at i4J Innovation for Jobs Summits in Mountain View, California, Paris, France, and authored a chapter of the group's 2016 book, Disrupting Unemployment: Reflection on a Sustainable, Middle Class Economic Recovery.

== Blockchain technologies ==
Harple sees blockchain technology as "a component tool that when integrated with other key enabling technologies, has the potential to create a simple, private, and direct relationship between those who offer value for sale, and those who purchase it".

As acting managing director for the Institute for Data Drive Design (ID3), a nonprofit research group founded out of MIT Media Lab, Harple led efforts to organize and frame work in digital currencies, identity solutions, trust frameworks, and big data integration, resulting in an industry announcement in the bitcoin segment: the ID3 Windhover Principles, a set of principles for identity, trust, and data to be implemented on an open source platform. Harple described the new digital framework, written collaboratively by digital currency industry stakeholders, as "an inclusive platform to transform how we, as collective Internet users, can take back our personal data, and share it in a trusted and secure way — not only for Bitcoin and digital currency transactions, but for other data and media types as well". The Windhover principles were subsequently endorsed by 21 of the leading Bitcoin and digital currency companies.

In March 2016, R. R. Donnelley & Sons teamed with Harple's Context Labs to pursue blockchain-enabled technology for its global publishing customers. The stated intent is to deliver platform solutions that "enable publishers to reach consumers with less friction, reduce their channel costs, and provide better direct one-on-one customer relationships". Harple commented that "blockchain technology has been evolving for several years and is now becoming integrated into work flows in supply chains and financial tech. We are delighted with RR Donnelley's decision to pursue these technologies for the publishing sector to enhance the role of publishers with the end consumers, at global scale."

In June 2016, Harple announced that blockchain-enabled platforms developed by Context Labs would provide contributions to the Open Music Initiative (OMI) with the intention of "accelerating a reference platform for OMI's goals for music". The initiative co-founded by Harple focuses on the development of an interoperable digital rights framework for the music industry.

== Pentalytics ==
In 2013, Harple devised an innovation ecosystem stakeholder model called the Penta Helix (aka Pentalytics), to describe innovative flow in ecosystems and drive systemic innovation. Pentalytics was derived from the research thesis Harple developed at MIT Sloan and was influenced by his founding of the Regional Entrepreneurial Acceleration Lab (REAL) and his term as Entrepreneur-in-Residence. It was subsequently used to develop an Innovation Dynamics platform called Innovation Scope, a real-time tool intended to provide insight into and navigation of innovation clusters.

According to Harple, the Pentalytics method uses advanced network graph analysis, and defines five key ecosystem attributes to make up a Pentalytic System, called the Penta Helix: Industry, Academia, Government, People, and Funding. As core variables used in modeling, the Penta Helix enables "big data methods and algorithmic tools on the Internet to interrogate large distributed economic global datasets, query and extract the relevant pre-defined cluster attribute data, filter and process it to present a deeper analytically comparative lens of innovation clusters". According to Harple's research, the resulting solution could be variously used as an "economic cluster modeling and tracking tool, an innovation lens on a given sector or geography, and as a tool for urban innovation mapping". Harple also describes Pentalytics potential as a predictive tool for network performance, and to navigate and assist decision-making related to resource allocations, partnership and contractual targets, angel and venture funding strategies, and the growth and linking of innovation clusters.

=== Use in industry ===
- The Open Music Initiative (OMI) represented the intersection of the Pentalytics framework for multi-stakeholder inclusion, designed to bring together disparate and competitive forces in a large market, focused on a common at-scale problem, and bringing that ecosystem together for a joint scalable solution. Based on the Pentalytics model, the OMI initiative's Penta Helix elements or five "pivot points" are Entrepreneurs, Risk Capital, Corporations, Governments, and Universities. According to Harple, the Pentalytics approach to OMI was intended to be "different by design", and combined network graph theory with Innovation Dynamics to understand how "disparate nodes in a graph develop and foster edges (connections)" to build a stronger network and provide "a deeper understanding of our ecosystem's connectivity".
- MOBI (Mobility Open Blockchain Initiative) used Pentalytics as a framework to design and structure the global transport/automotive industry's MOBI initiative. MOBI is a nonprofit organization working with forward thinking companies, governments, and NGOs to make mobility services more efficient, affordable, greener, safer, and less congested by promoting standards and accelerating adoption of blockchain, distributed ledger, and related technologies. Harple's Context Labs was a co-founder of the initiative and he serves on its advisory board. He described his collaboration with Chris Ballinger and MOBIs founding team as integrating "key structural and governance elements" from the Pentalytics modeling deployed in the co-founding of the Open Music Initiative, and that MOBIs model "further offers great potential for accelerated market adoption of transformative blockchain-enabled technologies".

== Academic affiliations ==
=== Boards ===
Harple has served on the following Academic Boards:

- The International School of Amsterdam, The Netherlands
- Tabor Academy, Marion, Massachusetts
- Harrisburg Academy, Harrisburg, Pennsylvania
- Marlboro College Graduate Center, Marlboro, Vermont
- Friends Academy, Dartmouth, Massachusetts

=== Massachusetts Institute of Technology ===
Harple was a 2012-2013 Sloan Fellow at MIT Sloan School of Management, where he founded the Regional Entrepreneurial Acceleration Lab (REAL) in 2012, and served as an entrepreneur in residence (EIR).

Harple has also collaborated on several MIT Media Lab courses and workshops, such as Beyond Smart Cities (2013), Changing Cities: How to Prototype New Urban Systems (2014), and Measuring Urban Innovation.

Harple has delivered numerous presentations at events such as the 2014 Kerberos & Internet Trust Conference.

=== Berklee College of Music ===
Harple is a member of the board of trustees of Berklee College of Music. In June 2016, Harple co-founded the Open Music Initiative in conjunction with the school's Institute for Creative Entrepreneurship and the MIT Media Lab Digital Currency Initiative. The OMI working group includes researchers from University College London and the backing of major music labels such as Universal, Sony, and Warner, plus platforms such as Spotify, Pandora and YouTube. OMI "aims to establish a global, open sourced platform, providing technology for a shared ledger of music creators and rights owners". Harple's Context Labs will provide operational, strategic, and technical guidance for OMI.

== Publications ==
- Disrupting Unemployment: Reflection on a Sustainable, Middle Class Economic Recovery. Ewing Marion Kauffman Foundation (February 4, 2016). Chapter on "Analytics Based on Big Data and Network Graph Science — Implications for Innovation for Jobs (i4j) Initiatives".
- The Big Analytics. Analytics Week. Chapter on "Big Data and Innovation".

== Awards ==
Harple has received a number of honors, including Inc. Magazine's Entrepreneur of the Year, the Red Herring Watch Award, the Upside Hot Startup Award, the NEA Presidents Award, the University of Rhode Island's Alumni Excellence Award for Contributions to Science and Technology and also its 2000 Engineering Entrepreneur Award. He has delivered presentations and keynote speeches at major computer industry events such as COMDEX, Networld/Interop, Internet World, and others as well as commencement addresses at universities such as Marlboro College and the University of Rhode Island.

== Non profits ==
Harple has been active with a variety of non-profits such as the Slater Center for Interactive Technologies, and the Buzzards Bay Coalition.

In 2013, Harple founded a Dutch non-profit for the purpose of advancing innovative capacity in the Netherlands via a multi-stakeholder process with academia, government, industry, entrepreneurs, and early-stage capital. The effort, shaped by the Pentalytics modeling used in Innovation Dynamics, influenced the decision process for the City of Amsterdam's desire to establish a new Technical Institute in the city.

== Personal life ==
Harple is the father of five children. His wife is Caren Brown Harple.
