= Stanley Cohen (physicist) =

American physicist

- Born: February 5, 1927
- Died: March 27, 2017 (aged 90)
- Known for: Speakeasy
- Scientific career
- Fields: Physics, Computer science

Stanley Cohen (February 5, 1927 – March 27, 2017) was an American physicist who worked at Argonne National Laboratory. He created Speakeasy, a numerical computational environment, implemented with OOPS, object-oriented system, and was the founder and president of Speakeasy Computing Corporation.
