= Predeclared =

Programming construct

In computer languages, the built-in information, encodings or tools that are available to a programmer are pre-declared, often in the form of entities, variables, objects, functions or instructions. It is mostly not possible to overwrite or otherwise manipulate them.

== Pre-declared entity ==
A pre-declared entity is a built-in notation convention for a character or a string. For example, in the HTML markup language, a large number of character and numeric entities are available to represent characters. In HTML, '&lt;' is a possible pre-declared entity to represent '<'. The programmer must not declare this entity by himself before he can use it, since it is already pre-declared by the specifications of the HTML language. Pre-declared entities are often used as escape sequences to represent information that would otherwise cause possible conflicts in its non-encoded form.

== Pre-declared variable ==
When a variable is pre-declared, it provides the programmer with information that he might be interested in. For example, in the Perl language, a variable %ENV is pre-declared, holding environmental information such as the operating system, host information, user information, and much more. Other pre-declared variables in Perl are %INC and %SIG. Almost all common programming languages provide the programmer with such pre-declared variables in one or another form.

When variables are pre-declared, it is commonly assumed that the value for the pre-declared name is also pre-assigned at the same time.

== Pre-declared object ==
Pre-declared objects have the same goal as pre-declared variables. For example, in the JavaScript language, the navigator-object is available to get all kinds of information about the browser that is running the script in question.

== Pre-declared functions and instructions ==
Pre-declared functions or instructions are built-in tools to perform common tasks. For example, in the earliest programming languages the square root needed to be calculated by hand. Nowadays programming languages have a pre-declared instruction or function for this task. Pre-declared functions or instructions often hold common tasks and their goal is to simplify the work of the programmer. The available pre-declared instructions or functions can in some languages be extended by using external libraries or modules.

== Narrow semantic sense ==
In a narrow strictly semantic sense, the term pre-declared may also refer to the declaration of a variable before an assignment takes place. In the following example, the first line is the (pre-)declaration and the second the assignment:

   var A;
   A = 1;

By declaring the name A, the program creates a namespace for the variable called A. In most modern languages, the variable does not need to be pre-declared on a separate line, as the following instruction achieves exactly the same:

   var A = 1;

In early computer languages, the variable always needed to be pre-declared as a separate instruction, because the operating system had to reserve a series of bytes in the available RAM, before the actual value of the variable could be stored in it. Declaration and assignment are still two fundamental different things, though they nowadays mostly appear in a same instruction line.
