= Playoff beard =

Superstitious practice originating in ice hockey

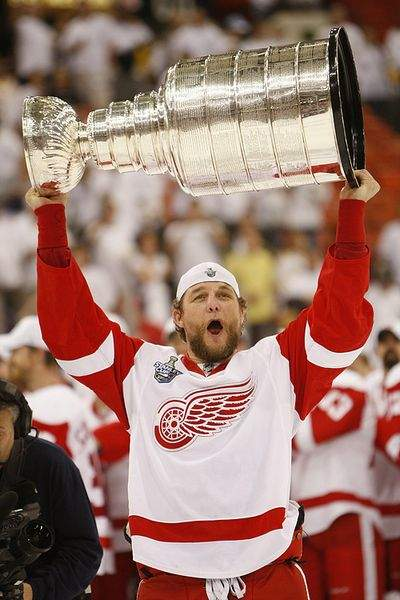
A bearded Darren McCarty hoisting the Stanley Cup with the Detroit Red Wings in 2008.

A playoff beard is the beard superstitiously retained by a male athlete who does not shave during playoffs. Playoff beards were introduced by ice hockey players participating in the Stanley Cup playoffs, and are now a tradition in many sports leagues. Many fans of professional sports teams also grow playoff beards. The player stops shaving when his team enters the playoffs and does not shave until his team is eliminated or wins the Stanley Cup (or equivalent championship).

The tradition was started in the early 1980s. Sometime in the early 1980s the New York Islanders decided to do so; and according to Islander Mike Bossy, was likely started by teammate Butch Goring. The 1984–85 Detroit Red Wings were the first team documented to wear them. Wings forwards Ivan Boldirev and Danny Gare began the practice in Jan. 1985, trying to inspire the team to win four straight games. Defenseman Brad Park called it his "playoff beard" - thus coining the phrase. The tradition is also practiced by nearly all North American hockey leagues, including high school leagues and the NCAA hockey teams, as well as minor league affiliates. According to some observers, one may trim the beard after a loss in an effort to change the team's luck; Jim Dowd and Roberto Luongo are examples of players who did this.

== History ==
The 1980 Islanders were the first team documented to wear them. This included two Swedish players (Stefan Persson and Anders Kallur), so it is possible that tennis champion Björn Borg's custom of not shaving his beard during Wimbledon, which he had been doing for several years by that time, was an influence on the start of the practice in hockey. Some players have said the beard is both a reminder of team unity and a way to get a player thinking about the playoffs from the moment he looks in the mirror in the morning. The 1984–85 Detroit Red Wings also did it. Wings forwards Ivan Boldirev and Danny Gare began the practice in Jan. 1985, trying to inspire the team to win four straight games. Defenseman Brad Park called it his "playoff beard" - thus coining the phrase. (from the Detroit Free Press, February 3, 1985 - article by Bernie Czarniecki). Hall of Famer Denis Potvin says that the Islanders of the 1980s would "play four games in five nights in the first round and it was just something that kind of happened." The 2009 Red Wings used the slogan "The beard is back" for the final series of their 2009 Stanley Cup playoffs run. They played the Pittsburgh Penguins in the Stanley Cup Finals that year (won by Pittsburgh) in which most of the players of both teams (and the owner of the Penguins, Mario Lemieux) grew beards.

In 2009, the Beard-a-thon campaign was launched to encourage fans to grow their own playoff beards for charity. In its first four years, more than 22,000 NHL fans participated in the "Beard-a-thon" and raised over two million dollars for charities.

In June 2015, Mark Lazarus, chairman of NBC Sports (who is the U.S. rightsholder of the league), told the Chicago Tribune that he had been lobbying the NHL to discourage the practice, arguing that it hinders the ability for viewers to recognize players.

== Other sports ==
The playoff beard has expanded into Major League Baseball (MLB), the Canadian Football League (CFL), the National Football League (NFL) and, to a lesser extent, the National Basketball Association (NBA). The practice generally resembles that of ice hockey, in that players do not shave until they either win a championship or are eliminated.

=== American football ===
- National Football League (NFL) players who have grown playoff beards include Chicago Bears quarterback (QB) Mitchell Trubisky, Seattle Seahawks quarterback (QB) Russell Wilson, Pittsburgh Steelers QB Ben Roethlisberger and defensive end (DE) Brett Keisel, New England Patriots wide receiver (WR) Julian Edelman and former Denver Broncos QB Jake Plummer. In fact, after Roethlisberger and his beard led the Steelers to their Super Bowl XL victory, he was shaved by David Letterman during an appearance on the Late Show with David Letterman.

=== Association football ===
- In 1993, Sheffield United's veteran striker Alan Cork did not shave during the club's four-month FA Cup run where they ultimately reached the semi-finals.
- In Major League Soccer (MLS), players on the Houston Dynamo roster kept a "lucky beard" for the duration of the 2006 and 2007 MLS Cup Playoffs. They renewed the tradition during their run to the 2011 MLS Cup.
- The LA Galaxy grew playoff beards during their run to the 2005 MLS Cup and again during the 2010 MLS Cup Playoffs.

=== Baseball ===
- The Boston Red Sox featured many players who grew beards during the team's 2013 season. "The beard-growing movement began in spring training with Mike Napoli and Jonny Gomes, and as the Red Sox kept winning — despite all predictions to the contrary — most of the team got on board with the beards." By the beginning of the World Series against the St. Louis Cardinals, only pitcher Koji Uehara was without facial hair. However, in the past, he did have a beard. Fans all over joined the team in solidarity as good luck to win the 2013 World Series. On October 23, 2013, Business Insider posted pictures of the Red Sox players with and without their good luck charms. An additional superstition for the team came during the season and post-season: when a player scores an especially important run, at the end of the game a tug would be given to this player's beard.

=== Basketball ===
- Cleveland Cavaliers center Zydrunas Ilgauskas wore a playoff beard in 2006, but did not bring it back for the 2007 playoffs, citing spousal disapproval.
- In a variant of the playoff beard, the Dallas Mavericks stopped shaving during the 2012–13 regular season until the team reached a .500 winning percentage (achieved in mid-April).

=== Tennis ===
- Starting in the late 1970s, five-time Wimbledon champion Björn Borg used to let his beard grow prior to that particular tournament. Referring to that custom, Sports Illustrated published an article about Borg shortly before the 1981 Wimbledon tournament titled, "The beard has begun."

=== Motorsport ===
- An October 2014 skit shows Team Penske personnel growing "Chase beards", including female staff.

== Fan beards ==
Fans often grow beards as a sign of support while their favorite team is in the playoffs.

- In 2006, the NPR show Weekend America featured a segment about St. Louis Cardinals fans who grew beards during the playoffs. Several Cardinals players grew beards as well.

== Outside of sports ==
- Male students at some universities in the United States, Canada, Sweden and New Zealand have also begun to sport an academic variation on the playoff beard - not shaving between the period when regular classes end and their final exam.
- in 1960, partly to distance themselves from non-contributing teammate Aad van Wijngaarden (known for taking credit for the work of others), scientists Edsger W. Dijkstra and Jaap Zonneveld agreed to not shave until they completed the Electrologica ALGOL 60 compiler.

== Other playoff hair ==
- During the 2010 playoffs, Patrick Kane (then of the Chicago Blackhawks) chose to style his hair into a "playoff mullet" in addition to growing a playoff beard. He did it because of his struggles to grow a beard the year before. He continued this throughout his career, including during the Chicago Blackhawks' 2013 and 2015 Championships.
- In the 2008 NHL Playoffs some of the Calgary Flames, including Craig Conroy, David Moss, Dustin Boyd and Jarome Iginla, got "faux-hawk" haircuts.
