= Carel S. Scholten =

Carel Scholten
- Education: University of Amsterdam
- Scientific career
- Fields: Computing science; Theoretical computer science
- Workplaces: Mathematisch Centrum; Electrologica; Philips Natuurkundig Laboratorium

Carel S. Scholten (Amsterdam, 1925 – 2009) was a physicist and a pioneer of computing.

He went to the Vossius Gymnasium in Amsterdam and then studied physics from 1945 to 1952 at the University of Amsterdam.

In 1947 he was asked by the Dutch Mathematisch Centrum (which later became the Centrum Wiskunde & Informatica) to collaborate in building an automatic calculator with his friend and fellow student Bram Loopstra. Their first system, the ARRA I was not a success, but its successor, the ARRA II, on which Gerrit Blaauw also collaborated, was.

In 1954 work started on the ARMAC, which he built together with Loopstra and Edsger W. Dijkstra, who was responsible for the software and collaborated with Scholten for more than 30 years. The ARMAC was remarkable for its use of transistors.

In 1958 Scholten went to work for Electrologica (later Philips Electrologica), where he developed the Electrologica X1 computer with Loopstra; up to 1964, 40 models were installed, mainly at universities. He remained with Philips Electrologica until 1979, when he switched to the Philips Natuurkundig Laboratorium, where he stayed until 1985.

In 1991 he was awarded an honorary doctorate by Technische Universiteit Eindhoven.

== Publications ==
- Edsger W. Dijkstra and Carel S. Scholten (1990). Predicate Calculus and Program Semantics. Springer-Verlag ISBN 0-387-96957-8 – An abstract, formal treatment of Predicate transformer semantics
