= Zonneveld =

Zonneveld is a Dutch toponymic surname meaning "sun field". Variant forms are Sonneveld, Sonneveldt, Van Zonneveld, and Zonneveldt. Notable people with the surname include:

- Ani Zonneveld (born 1962), Malaysian-American singer
- Ben Zonneveld (born 1940), Dutch plant scientist
- Jaap A. Zonneveld (1924–2016), Dutch computer scientist
- Jan Zonneveld (1918–1995), Dutch geologist and physical geographer
- Mike Zonneveld (born 1980), Dutch football defender
- Niels Zonneveld (born 1998), Dutch darts player
- Patrick Zonneveld (born 1988), Dutch football goalkeeper
- Reinier Zonneveld (born 1991), Dutch DJ and record producer
- Thijs Zonneveld (born 1980), Dutch racing cyclist
- Wesley Zonneveld (born 1992), Dutch football goalkeeper

Sonneveld

- Wim Sonneveld (1917–1974), Dutch cabaretier artist
