= ARRA (computer) =

First Dutch computer

The ARRA (Automatische Relais Rekenmachine Amsterdam; Automatic Relay Calculator Amsterdam) was the first Dutch computer, and was built from relays for the Dutch Mathematical Centre (Mathematisch Centrum), which later became the Centrum Wiskunde & Informatica (CWI).

== Computer ==
It was designed and built by Carel Scholten and Bram Loopstra, and was finished in 1952. Because of reliability problems it was soon taken out of commission, and "updated" to the ARRA II, which actually was a completely new design. In December 1953, electronic ARRA II performed its first programs and was completed in 1954.

== Subsequent computers ==
Other computers designed and built at the Mathematical Centre:

- FERTA (computer)
- ARMAC (computer), 1956

Other very early Dutch computers:

- P3 (computer)
- PASCAL (computer)
- PETER (computer)
- PTERA (computer), 1953
- STEVIN (computer)
- Testudo (computer)
- Electrologica X1
- X2 (computer)
- X4 (computer)
- Electrologica X8
- ZEBRA (computer)
- ZERO (computer)
