= Bram Jan Loopstra =

Bram Jan Loopstra (1925 – 1979) was a Dutch computing pioneer who worked at the Mathematisch Centrum, Amsterdam and then at Electrologica with Adriaan van Wijngaarden, Carel S. Scholten and Gerrit Blaauw. From 1956 until at least 1963 he was technical director of Electrologica. At his death after a long illness on March 22, 1979, he was adjunct director of the Philips International Institute.

At the Mathematisch Centrum he contributed to the ARRA I and II and ARMAC.

== Selected publications ==
- Loopstra, B. J. "Logische synthese van rekencircuits." Stichting Mathematisch Centrum. Zuivere Wiskunde ZW 10/52 (Actualiteiten) (1952): 1-7.
- Loopstra, B. J. "The X—1 Computer." The Computer Journal 2.1 (1959): 39-43.
- Loopstra, B. J. "Input and output in the X-1 system." COMMUNICATIONS OF THE ACM. Vol. 2. No. 7. 1959.
