= Marc Stevens (cryptology) =

Dutch cryptographer (born 1981)

- Born: April 7, 1981 (age 45)
- Other name: Marc Martinus Jacobus Stevens
- Education: Leiden University; Eindhoven University of Technology
- Known for: Cryptography
- Scientific career
- Fields: Computer Science
- Theses: Attacks on Hash Functions and Applications (2012); On Collisions for MD5 (2007)
- Academic advisors: Ronald Cramer; Arjen Lenstra

Dr. ir. Marc Stevens is a cryptology researcher most known for his work on cryptographic hash collisions and for the creation of the chosen-prefix hash collision tool HashClash as part of his master's degree thesis. He first gained international attention for his work with Alexander Sotirov, Jacob Appelbaum, Arjen Lenstra, David Molnar, Dag Arne Osvik, and Benne de Weger in creating a rogue SSL certificate which was presented in 2008 during the 25th annual Chaos Communication Congress warning of the dangers of using the MD5 hash function in issuing SSL certificates. Several years later in 2012, according to Microsoft, the authors of the Flame malware used similar methodology to that which the researchers warned of by initiating an MD5 collision to forge a Windows code-signing certificate. Marc was most recently awarded the Google Security Privacy and Anti-abuse applied award. Google selected Stevens for this award in recognition of his work in Cryptanalysis, in particular related to the SHA-1 hash function.

In February 2017, the first known successful SHA-1 collision attack in practice (termed "SHAttered") was recognized. Marc Stevens was first-credited in the subsequent paper along with CWI Amsterdam colleague Pierre Karpman, and researchers Elie Bursztein, Ange Albertini, Yarik Markov, Alex Petit Bianco, Clement Baisse from Google.

Marc is currently employed as a Cryptology Researcher at Centrum Wiskunde & Informatica.
