= Jan L. A. van de Snepscheut =

- Born: September 12, 1953; Oosterhout, Netherlands
- Died: February 23, 1994 (aged 40); La Cañada Flintridge, California, United States
- Education: Eindhoven University of Technology
- Scientific career
- Fields: Computer science
- Workplaces: Eindhoven University of Technology, University of Twente, University of Groningen, California Institute of Technology
- Doctoral advisor: Martin Rem, Edsger Dijkstra
- Doctoral students: Peter Hofstee

Johannes Lambertus Adriana van de Snepscheut (Dutch: [ˈsnɛpsxøːt]; 12 September 1953 – 23 February 1994) was a Dutch computer scientist and educator. He was a student of Martin Rem and Edsger Dijkstra. At the time of his death, he was a professor of Computing Science at the California Institute of Technology. He was also developing an editor for proving theorems called "Proxac".

== Biography ==
Van de Snepscheut graduated from the Eindhoven University of Technology as an electrical engineer in 1977, with a thesis advised by Frans E. J. Krusman Aretz from the mathematics department. During this time, he also co-founded a microprocessor company, and he would later found a second. After working for a year at the University of Twente, he returned to Eindhoven, where he earned his PhD in 1983. He then spent a year visiting the California Institute of Technology before starting as faculty at the University of Groningen. In 1988, van de Snepscheut moved with his family back to Caltech, where he continued his research career and published his book, What Computing Is All About.

In the early morning hours of February 23, 1994, van de Snepscheut attacked his sleeping wife, Terre (elsewhere given as Trees), supposedly with an axe later found at the site. He then set their house on fire, and died as it burned around him. Terre and their three children, aged 14, 12, and 10, escaped their burning home.

== Selected bibliography ==
- Trace Theory and VLSI Design, PhD thesis, entirely handwritten, including the index. Later published as Volume 200 of Lecture Notes in Computer Science.
- What computing is all about, a survey of selected fundamental topics in computer science, described by Dijkstra as "an absolute treasure, strongly reflecting both [van de Snepscheut's] excitement as a scientist and his dedication as an educator".
