= Ute Ebert =

German physicist

Ute M. Ebert is a German physicist known for her research on plasma physics and electric discharge in gases. She is a researcher in the Netherlands at the Centrum Wiskunde & Informatica, where she heads the research group on multiscale dynamics, and a part-time full professor at the Eindhoven University of Technology, affiliated with the Elementary Processes in Gas Discharges group.

== Education and career ==
Ebert was a physics student at Heidelberg University from 1980 to 1987, and at the Hebrew University of Jerusalem from 1987 to 1988. She completed a doctorate (Dr. rer. nat.) in 1994 at the University of Essen.

After postdoctoral research at Leiden University, she became a researcher at the Centrum Wiskunde & Informatica (CWI) in 1998, and added her part-time affiliation with the Eindhoven University of Technology (TU/e) in 2002.

== Research ==
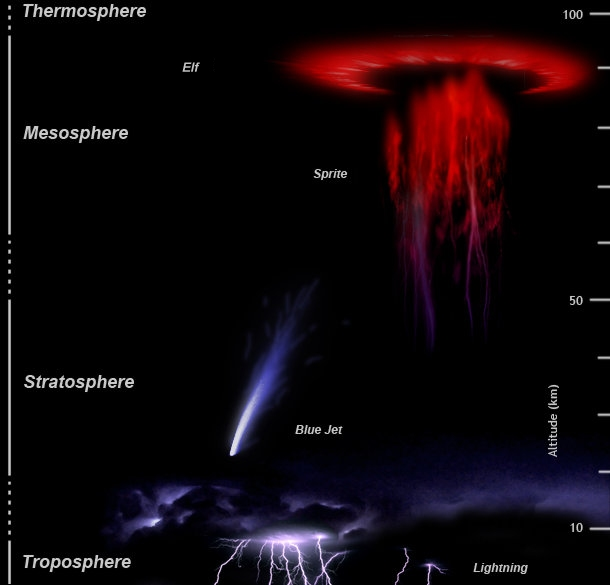
Ebert has contributed a lot to the modelling of lightning discharges. 'Normal' lightning that can be seen from the earth arises under clouds in the troposphere. Discharges that happen at higher altitude are simpler to model and are therefore very useful to better understand lightning.

Ebert's doctoral dissertation, Diffusion langer Polymerketten in einem eingefrorenen Zufallsmedium: eine Renormierungsgruppenanalyse, concerned the use of renormalization to analyze the diffusion of polymers; she also studied phytoplankton dynamics before shifting to her present interest in gas discharges. Her research projects on this topic at CWI are more theoretical, while her work at TU/e is experimental and applied.

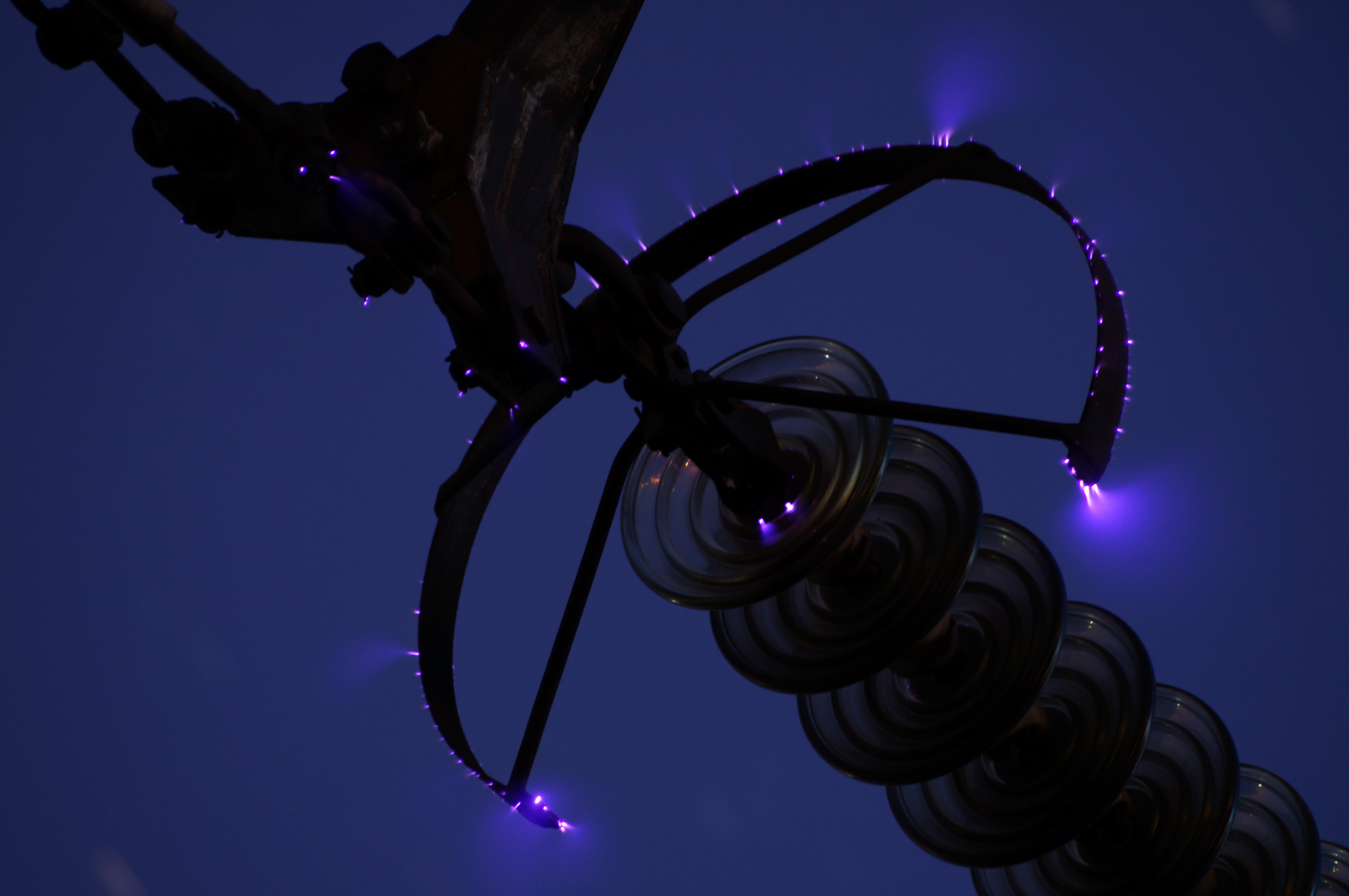
Long exposure photograph of corona discharge on an insulator string of a 500 kV overhead power line. This type of power loss was the research subject in the project 'Creeping Sparks'

Ebert's groups currently work on projects on lightning physics, high voltage technology in the context of electricity nets, and applications of pulsed plasmas in agriculture and combustion engines. She has made important contributions to the modelling of lightning using partial differential equations. She is a specialist in analytical model reductions, numerical multiscale modelling and non-linear dynamics. For example, in her joint work with numerical analysts she managed to mimic lightning discharges to a very detailed level. Laboratorium experiments sustained and confirmed the theoretical research.

Ebert published over 170 articles in international peer-reviewed journals. She was the principal advisor of 15 PhD students, all at the TU/e. Most of them worked on one of the big projects for which Ebert was (one of) the principal investigator(s). Ebert and her students worked on three out of seven STW projects in the programme 'Building on Transient Plasmas' (2009). She and her co-authors developed models describing how lightning starts in thunder clouds, namely by an interaction between sharp-edged hail and cosmic particles. Another important project, financed by STW en ABB Corporate Research, was the 'Creeping sparks project' in which Ebert and her students developed novel mathematical models and techniques to better understand the fundamental physics of sparks creeping along insulator surfaces.

== Recognition ==
Ebert won the Minerva Prize, a biennial prize for the best Dutch physics publication by a woman, in 2004. She has been a member of the Koninklijke Hollandsche Maatschappij der Wetenschappen since 2006.
