= HashClash =

BOINC based volunteer computing project

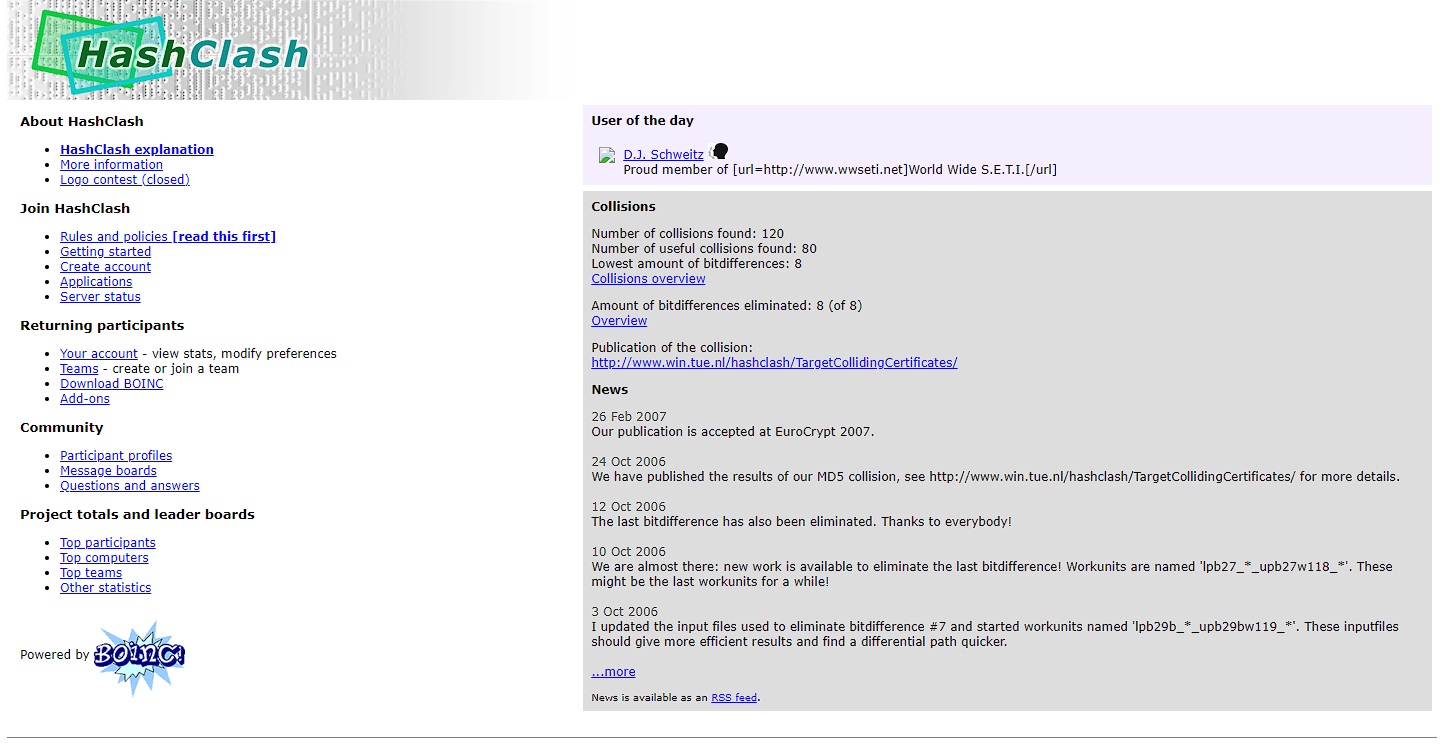
- Operating system: cross-platform
- Platform: BOINC
- Website: web.archive.org/web/20071016235617/http://boinc.banaan.org:80/hashclash/

HashClash was a volunteer computing project running on the Berkeley Open Infrastructure for Network Computing (BOINC) software platform to find collisions in the MD5 hash algorithm. It was based at the Department of Mathematics and Computer Science at the Eindhoven University of Technology, and Marc Stevens initiated the project as part of his master's degree thesis.

The project ended after Stevens defended his M.Sc. thesis in June 2007. However, SHA1 was added later, and the code repository was ported to git in 2017.

The project was used to create a rogue certificate authority certificate in 2009.

== See also ==
- Berkeley Open Infrastructure for Network Computing (BOINC)
- List of volunteer computing projects
