= Stanley Cup playoffs =

Elimination tournament in the National Hockey League

- Most recent season or competition: 2026 Stanley Cup playoffs
- Sport: Ice hockey
- Founded: As an event held on a challenge basis: 1893; As a prearranged inter-league competition: 1915; As solely the National Hockey League postseason: 1927
- No. of teams: 16
- Most recent champion: Carolina Hurricanes (2)
- Most titles: Montreal Canadiens (24)
- Broadcasters: Canada; Sportsnet; TVA Sports; United States; ABC/ESPN/ESPN2; TNT/TBS; Various regional sports networks (first round only); International: See list
- Streaming partners: Canada: Sportsnet+; United States: ESPN DTC/Disney+; HBO Max
- Website: Stanley Cup playoffs

The Stanley Cup playoffs (French: Les séries éliminatoires de la Coupe Stanley) is the annual elimination tournament to determine the winner of the Stanley Cup, and the league champion of the National Hockey League (NHL). The four-round, best-of-seven tournament is held after the NHL's regular season. Eight teams from each of the league's two conferences qualify for the playoffs based on regular season points totals. The final round is known as the Stanley Cup Final, which matches the two conference champions.

The NHL is the only one of the big four major leagues in Canada and the United States to refer to its playoffs by the name of its championship trophy, a tradition which has arisen because the Stanley Cup is North America's oldest professional sports trophy, dating back more than two decades before the establishment of the NHL. Originally inscribed the Dominion Hockey Challenge Cup, the trophy was donated in 1892 by Lord Stanley of Preston, then–governor general of Canada, initially as a "challenge trophy" for Canada's top-ranking amateur ice hockey club. From 1893 when the first Cup was awarded to 1914, the champions held onto the Cup until they either lost their league title to another club, or a champion from another league issued a formal challenge and defeated the reigning Cup champion in a final game to claim their win. Professional teams then first became eligible to challenge for the Stanley Cup in 1906. Starting in 1915, the Cup was officially contested between the champion of the National Hockey Association (NHA) and the champion of the Pacific Coast Hockey Association (PCHA). After a series of league mergers and folds, including the 1917 establishment of the NHL as a successor to the NHA, the Stanley Cup became the championship trophy of the NHL prior to the 1926–27 season.

The NHL has always used a playoff tournament to determine its champion. The league's playoff system has changed over the years, from the NHL's inception in 1917, to when the NHL took over the Cup in 1926, to the current setup today.

== Current format ==
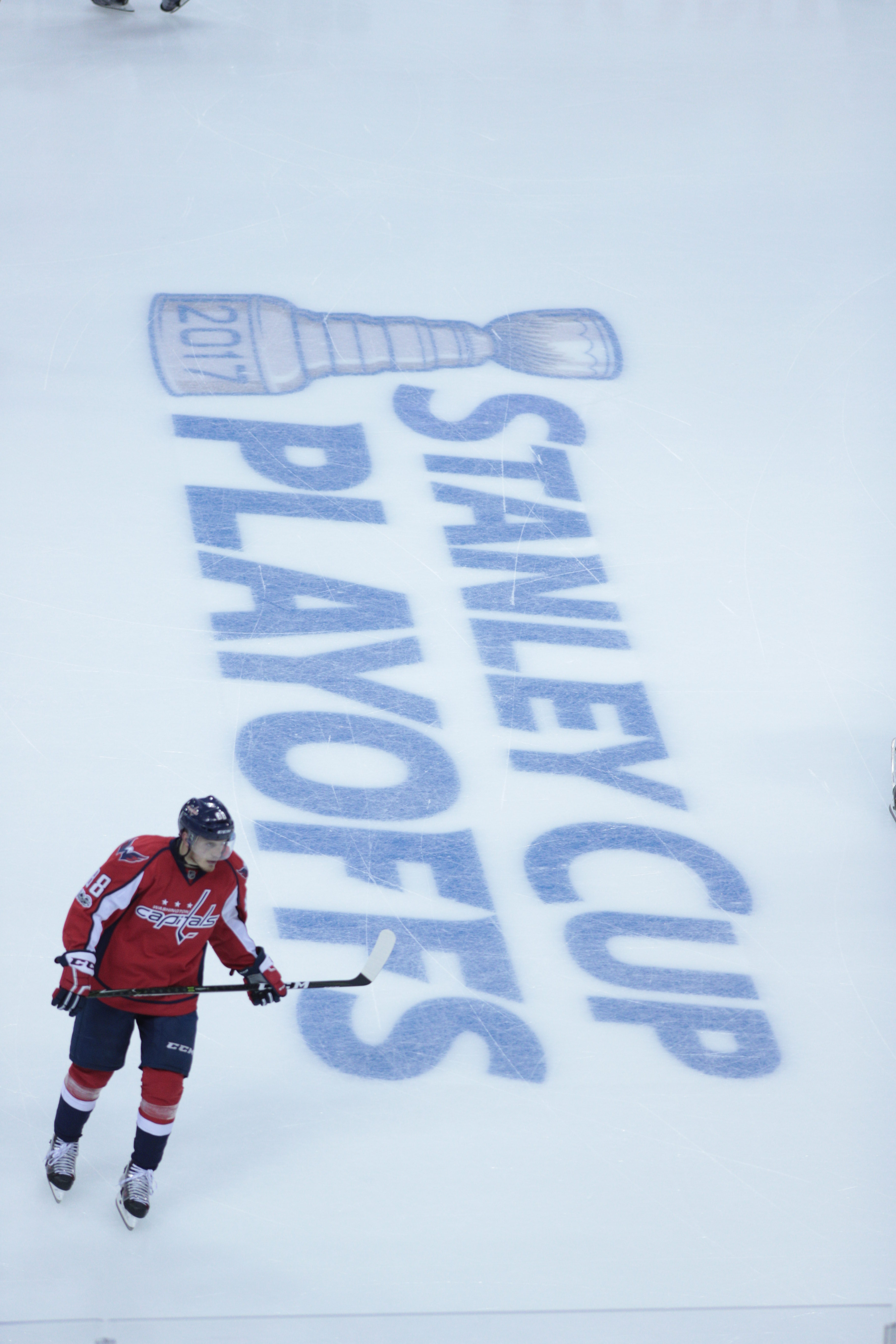
No. 88 - Nate Schmidt of the Washington Capitals skates near the Stanley Cup playoffs logo during their May 10, 2017 game against the Pittsburgh Penguins

=== Format ===
The Stanley Cup playoffs consists of four rounds of best-of-seven series. Each series is played in a 2–2–1–1–1 format, where the team with home-ice advantage hosts games one, two, five, and seven, while their opponent hosts games three, four, and six. Games five, six, and seven are only played if needed.

Eight teams in each conference qualify for the playoffs. In the playoff series format instituted in 2014, the first, second, and third place teams in each of the four divisions qualify for the playoffs automatically. Two additional teams from each conference, regardless of divisional alignment, also qualify for the playoffs by having the highest point totals out of the remaining teams in the conference. These teams are referred to as the wild cards. Since there is no attention paid to divisional alignment with the wild cards, it is possible for one division in a conference to have five teams in the postseason while the other has just three.

In the first round, the teams are split into two separate brackets by conference. Each bracket consists of the top three divisional qualifiers and one of the wild cards. The lower seeded wild card plays against the division winner with the best record while the other wild card plays against the other division winner, and both wild cards are de facto No. 4 seeds. The other two series match the second and third place teams from the divisions.

The winners of both first round series advance to the second round. The reseeding in the previous format, which ensured the top seed would play the lowest remaining seed, was discarded, as it is no longer possible. The first round is the only round where the better teams play easier opponents, as every other round is played by the winner of another series, thus leaving no opportunities to reseed. The winners of these series advance to the conference finals and the two conference finals winners move on to the Stanley Cup Final.

In the first two rounds, the higher-seeded team has home-ice advantage (regardless of point record). Thereafter, it goes to the team with the better regular season record (regardless of seeding); in the case of a tie, the league's standard tie-breaking procedure is applied. The team with home-ice advantage hosts games one, two, five, and seven, while the opponent hosts games three, four, and six (games five through seven are played if necessary).

Any ties in the standings at the end of the regular season are broken using the following protocols:

1. The greater number of regulation wins only (used since the 2019–20 NHL season, reflected by the RW statistic).
2. The greater number of regulation and overtime wins, excluding shootouts (used since the 2010–11 NHL season, reflected by the ROW statistic).
3. The greater number of total wins, including shootouts.
4. The greater number of points earned in games between the tied clubs.
  1. If two clubs are tied, and have not played an equal number of home games against each other, the points earned and available in the first game played in the city of the club that had the greater number of home games in games between the two are not included.
  2. If more than two clubs are tied, the higher percentage of available points earned in games among those clubs, and not including any "odd" games, are used to determine the standing. The "odd" games are identical to those mentioned in the previous paragraph, that is, the first game in the city of the club that has had more home games in games between each club in the tie. Note that, because of this procedure, if two teams in the multi team tie (also applicable in a two team tie) have only played once against each other, the points earned in that game are not included.
5. The greater differential between goals for and goals against during the entire regular season.
6. The greater number of goals for (used since the 2019–20 NHL season, reflected by the GF statistic).
7. If two clubs are still tied on regulation wins, regulation and overtime wins, total wins, points earned between the tied clubs (excluding the points earned and available in the first game played in the city of the club that had the greater number of home games in games between the two), regular season goal differential, and regular season goal scored, a one-game playoff is played under Stanley Cup playoff rules.

=== Overtime rules ===
Unlike the regular season where a contest could eventually be decided in a shootout, overtime in the playoffs is played in multiple sudden-death, 20-minute five-on-five periods until one team scores. Although a playoff game could theoretically last indefinitely, only two contests have reached six overtime periods, and neither of those went beyond six. During playoff overtime periods, the only break is to shovel away the loose ice shavings at the first stoppage after the period is halfway finished.

== History ==
=== Origins ===
The Stanley Cup was commissioned in 1892 as the Dominion Hockey Challenge Cup and was named after Lord Stanley of Preston, the Governor General of Canada who donated it as an award to Canada's top-ranking amateur ice hockey club. The entire Stanley family supported the sport, the sons and daughters all playing and promoting the game. The first Cup was then awarded in 1893 to Montreal Hockey Club.

During the period from 1893 to 1914, the champions held the Cup until they lost their league title to another club, or a champion from another league issued a formal challenge and subsequently defeated them in a special game or series. The competitive format of each Cup challenge was determined by negotiation between the two clubs. Furthermore, none of the leagues that played for the Cup had a formal playoff system to decide their respective champions; whichever team finished in first place after the regular season won the league title. A playoff would only be played if teams tied for first-place in their leagues at the end of the regular season.

As the prestige of winning the Cup grew, so did the need to attract top players, and thus professional teams first became eligible to challenge for the Stanley Cup in 1906. Then in 1908, the Allan Cup was introduced as the trophy for Canada's amateurs, and the Stanley Cup became a symbol of professional hockey supremacy. In 1910, the National Hockey Association (NHA) held its inaugural season and soon emerged as the best professional hockey league in Canada, keeping the Cup for the next four years. In 1914, the Victoria Aristocrats of the Pacific Coast Hockey Association (PCHA) challenged the NHA and Cup champion Toronto Blueshirts. One year later, the NHA and the PCHA began an agreement in which their respective champions would face each other annually for the Stanley Cup, effectively ending the Cup challenge games.

After years of the NHA not having an annual playoff tournament to determine its league champion, the 1916–17 NHA season saw the league split its schedule into two halves with the top team from each half moving on to the league finals, which was a two-game total goals series. The PCHA continued to award their league title to the team that finished in first place after the regular season.

=== Emergence of the NHL ===
The National Hockey League (NHL) was founded in November 1917 as a successor to the NHA. From the NHL's inception until 1920, both NHL and PCHA teams were eligible for the Stanley Cup. The NHL inherited the NHA's regular season system of dividing it into two halves, with the top team from each half moving on to the league finals. The NHL finals was a two-game total goals series in 1918 and a best-of-seven series in 1919. In 1920, the Ottawa Senators were automatically declared the league champion when the team had won both halves of the regular season. The two halves format was abandoned the next year, and the top two teams faced off for the NHL championship in a two-game total goals series.

At the time, the NHL champion would later face the winners of the PCHA and, from 1921, the Western Canada Hockey League (WCHL) in further rounds in order to determine the Stanley Cup champion. During this time, as the rules of the NHL and those of the western leagues differ (the main difference being that NHL rules allowed five skaters while the western leagues allowed six), the rules for each game in the Stanley Cup Final alternated between those of the NHL and the western leagues. Before the WCHL competed for the Stanley Cup, the Cup championship series was a best-of-five series. Following the involvement of the WCHL, one league champion was given a bye straight to the finals (a best-of-three affair starting in 1922), while the other two competed in a best-of-three semifinal. As travel expenses were high during these times, it was often the case that the NHL champions were sent west to compete. In a dispute between the leagues in 1923 about whether to send one or both western league champions east, the winner of the PCHA/WCHL series would proceed to the Stanley Cup Final, while the loser of the series would face the NHL champion, both series being best-of-three.

In 1924, the NHL playoffs expanded from two to three teams (with the top team getting a bye to the two-game total goal NHL finals), but because the first-place Hamilton Tigers refused to play under this format, the second and third place teams played for the NHL championship in a two-game total goals affair. The Stanley Cup Final series returned to a best-of-five format the same year.

=== NHL takes control of Stanley Cup ===
With the merger of the PCHA and WCHL in 1925 and the merged league's collapse in 1926, the NHL took de facto control of the Stanley Cup. While the Cup would not be formally deeded to the league until 1947, from 1926 onward the NHL playoffs and the Stanley Cup playoffs are considered synonymous. The NHL was subsequently divided into the Canadian and American divisions for the 1926–27 season. For 1927, six teams qualified for the playoffs, three from each division, with the division semifinals and finals being a two-game total goals affair, and the Stanley Cup Final becoming a best-of-five series. In 1928, the playoff format was changed so that the two teams with identical division ranking would face each other (i.e., the division winners played each other, the second place teams play each other, and likewise for the third place teams). The first place series was a best-of-five affair, with the winner proceeding to the best-of-three Stanley Cup Final, while the others were a two-game total goals series. The winner of the second and third place series played each other in a best-of-three series, with the winner earning the other berth to the Stanley Cup Final. This format had a slight modification the following year, where the semifinal series became a two-game total goals affair and the Stanley Cup Final became a best-of-five series. The two-game total goals format was abolished in 1937, with those series being changed to best-of-three affairs.

=== Original Six era (1942–1967) ===
The 1930s saw the reduction of teams from ten to seven, which resulted in an end to the Canadian and American divisions. The Stanley Cup playoffs saw the first- and second-place teams play against each other in a best-of-seven series for one berth in the Stanley Cup Final, while the third- to sixth-place teams battled in a series of best-of-three matches for the other berth (with the third-place team taking on the fourth-place team, and the fifth-place team against the sixth-place team). In 1939, the Stanley Cup Final became a best-of-seven series, the format still used today.

The 1942–43 season saw the removal of the Brooklyn Americans, leaving six remaining teams (now known as the "Original Six"). From 1943 to 1967, all playoff match ups were best-of-seven affairs. The first and third-place teams played in one semifinal, while the second and fourth-place teams played in the other semifinal, with the semifinal winners advancing to the Stanley Cup Final. During this time, Detroit Red Wings fans often threw an octopus onto the ice as a good luck charm, as eight wins were required to win the Stanley Cup.

=== Expansion era (1967–1993) ===
The 1967 expansion saw the number of teams double from six to twelve for the 1967–68 season, and with it the creation of the West and East divisions. The playoff format remained largely the same, with four teams in each division qualifying for the playoffs, all series remaining best-of-seven, and the division champions battling for the Stanley Cup. The 1970–71 season, because of fan demand, brought forth the first inter-conference playoff match up outside of the Stanley Cup Final since the pre-war expansion, which had the winner of the second-place versus fourth-place match up in one division take on the winner of the first- versus third-place match up in the other division for a berth in the Stanley Cup Final. The following year had one minor change to its playoff format: a stronger team would face a weaker opponent. Thus, instead of a first-place versus third-place and a second versus fourth-place match up in the first round, the first round had the first-place versus the fourth and the second versus the third-place. This practice of having stronger teams facing weaker opposition has continued to the present day. This change necessitated the need to reseed the winners of the quarterfinals by matching up the highest remaining seed of one division against the lowest remaining seed from the other division in the semifinals.

The 1974–75 season saw another change to the playoff system to accommodate a league that had expanded to 18 teams in two conferences and four divisions. Under this system, twelve teams qualified for the playoffs. The top team from each division would earn a bye to the quarterfinal, while the second- and third-place teams from each division started their playoff run from a best-of-three preliminary round. In each round of the playoffs, the teams remaining were seeded regardless of divisional or conference alignment, with the preliminary-round series being a best-of-three affair while the remainder of the series remained best-of-seven. The 1977–78 season had one minor change in its playoff format: although the second-place finishers from each division would qualify for the preliminary round, the four playoff spots reserved for the third-place teams were replaced by four wild-card spots—spots for the four teams with the highest regular season point total that did not finish first or second in their divisions.

With the absorption of four teams from the World Hockey Association in the 1979–80 season, a new playoff system was introduced where 16 of the league's 21 teams qualified for postseason play. The four division winners qualified for the playoffs while twelve wild-card positions rounded out the sixteen teams. At the beginning of each round the teams were seeded based on their regular season point totals, with the preliminary round being a best-of-five series while all other playoff series were best-of-seven.

The 1981–82 season brought forth the return of divisional matchups, with the top four teams from each division qualifying for the playoffs. Division champions would be determined, followed by the conference champions, who would meet in the Stanley Cup Final. The division semifinals was a best-of-five affair until the 1986–87 season, when it became a best-of-seven series, while all other series remained best-of seven.

=== Modern era (1993–present) ===
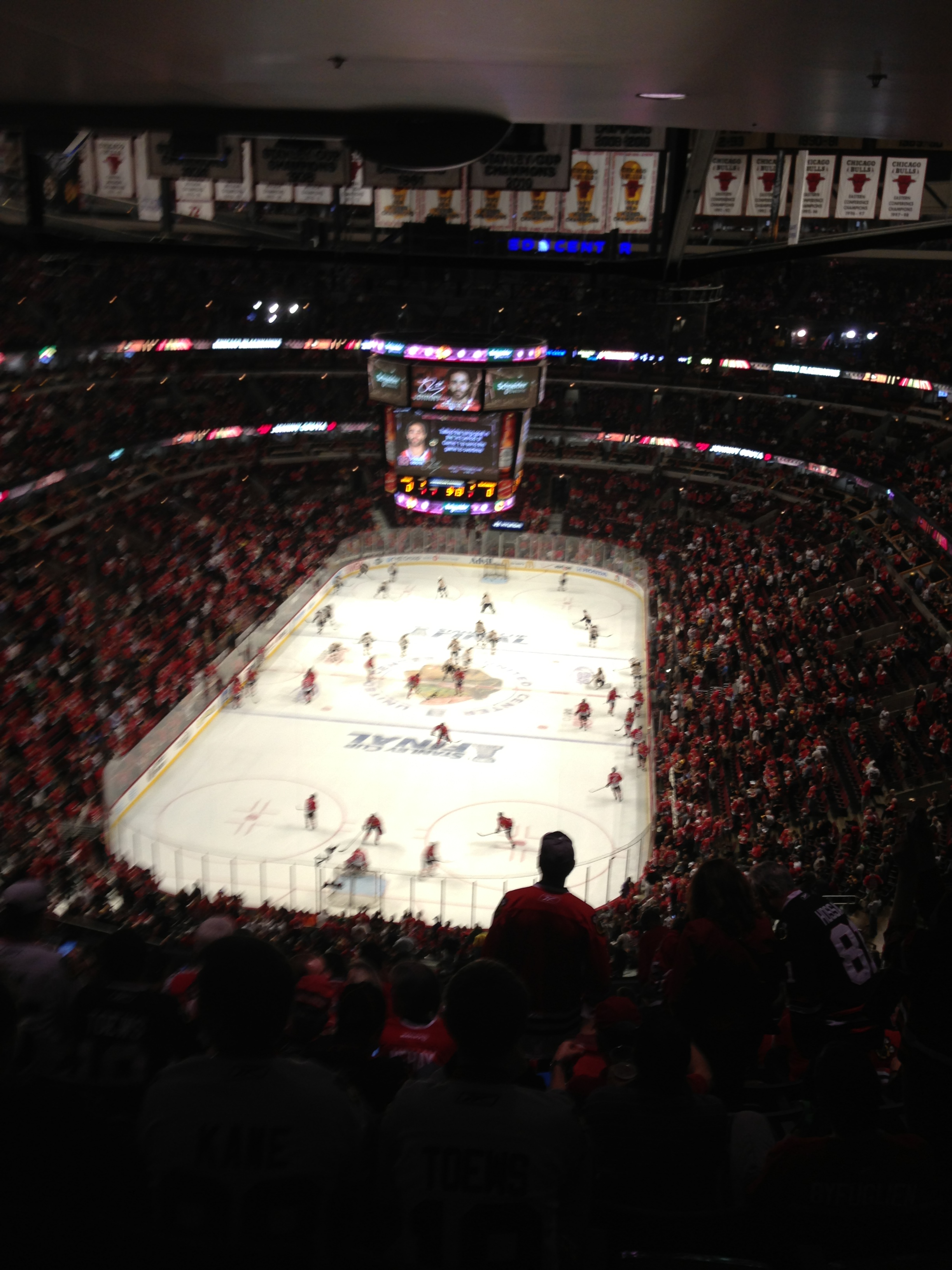
The Boston Bruins and Chicago Blackhawks warming up before Game 2 of the 2013 Stanley Cup Final

For the 1993–94 season, the league revamped its playoff structure to become conference-based rather than division-based. Eight teams in each conference qualified for the playoffs. The first-place teams in each division were seeded first and second in their respective conference playoffs; the next six best teams in each conference also qualified and were seeded third through eighth. All teams played in the conference quarterfinals: first-place versus eighth, second versus seventh, third versus sixth, and fourth versus fifth; after each round, the surviving teams were reseeded to play the conference semifinals, then a conference final, with the conference champions playing against each other in the Stanley Cup Final. Home ice advantage was determined by higher seed in the first three rounds and by regular season points of the two teams in the Stanley Cup Final. All series were best of seven, but the arrangement of home games was changed for Central and Pacific division teams. Instead of the normal 2–2–1–1–1 rotation, a series involving teams from both divisions was 2–3–2, with the higher-seeded team having the option of starting play at home or on the road (this format was used four times in 1994 and one time in 1999 as an emergency measure; between 1995 and 1998, all higher-seeded teams opted to start play at home with the 2–2–1–1–1 format).

For the 1998–99 season, the league re-organized into two conferences of three divisions apiece, resulting in the playoff format used through the 2012–13 season. The qualifiers remained sixteen, but the seeding changed. The three first-place teams in each division qualified and were seeded first through third for the playoffs; of the other teams in each conference, the top five finishers qualified for the fourth through eighth seeds. The format otherwise remained identical to that of the 1994–1998 system.

The NHL realigned into a four-division, two-conference system for the 2013–14 season. Under the postseason system from 2013–14 to the present (excluding the seasons that were changed due to the COVID-19 pandemic), the top three teams in each division make the playoffs, with two wild-cards in each conference (for a total of eight playoff teams from each conference). The format is division-based, similar to the 1982 system. In the first round, the top-ranked team in the conference plays against the lowest-ranked wild-card, while the other division winner plays against the higher-ranked wild-card. The second- and third-place teams in each division play each other. The first-round winners then meet in the second round. The third round still consists of the Western Conference and Eastern Conference finals, with those conference winners advancing to the Stanley Cup Final.

==== Temporary formats during the COVID-19 pandemic ====
Special formats were used in 2020 and 2021 due to the COVID-19 pandemic.

As a result of the pandemic prematurely ending the 2019–20 regular season, a 24-team, conference-based format (with 12 from each conference) was adopted for the 2020 playoffs. Seeding was based on each team's points percentage at the time the regular season was suspended on March 12. The top four teams competed in a round-robin tournament to determine final seeding in the first round, while the bottom eight seeds in each conference played in a best-of-five series to determine who advanced to face one of the round-robin teams in the first round, after which they were re-seeded 5th–8th. Teams then were re-seeded after each round similar to the conference-based formats used from 1994 to 2013.

The closure of the Canada–United States border during the 2020–21 regular season caused the NHL to temporarily abolish both conferences and realign into four different divisions, putting all Canadian teams into one of those divisions. The top four teams in each division then made the 2021 playoffs. All four rounds of the playoffs remained as best-of-seven series, and the first two rounds of the playoffs featured intra-divisional matchups similar to the division-based formats previously used. The four division champions were reseeded based on regular season point total in the Stanley Cup semifinals. The best-ranked division winner played against the worst-ranked division winner, while the other two division champions faced-off against each other, with the second-best division champion having home-ice advantage. The winners of these series advanced to the Stanley Cup Final, as before.

== Traditions and trends ==
Compared to other major professional sports leagues, playoff upsets are relatively common in the NHL. According to NHL broadcaster Darren Eliot, this is because the style of competition in the playoffs is different from the regular season: instead of playing different teams each game, the goal is to advance through four best-of-seven playoff series. The Presidents' Trophy winner may have to go through other playoff clubs who might have a better goaltender, a better defensive team, or other players that pose matchup problems. If the regular season champion's primary success was only outscoring others, they may be out of luck facing goaltenders that can shut them out. For the first time, during the 2019 Stanley Cup playoffs, all division winners were eliminated in the first round, which also saw the first instance that a Presidents' Trophy winner was swept 4–0 in the opening round.

Although rare, another aspect is that the NHL leads the other leagues in game seven comebacks. In four instances an NHL team has been able to come back from being down 0–3 to win a seven-game series: the 1941–42 Toronto Maple Leafs, the 1974–75 New York Islanders, the 2009–10 Philadelphia Flyers, and the 2013–14 Los Angeles Kings. There has been only one such "reverse sweep" comeback in MLB postseason (the 2004 Boston Red Sox) and none in the NBA playoffs.

It is the reality of the sport. If your particular strength happens to be that you're really good offensively, and you come up against a hot goaltender and a team that is stout defensively, it might not matter that you were good on a nightly basis scoring goals. And that one particular opponent: you'll have to beat them four times.

— NHL broadcaster Darren Eliot explaining the lack of success of Presidents' Trophy winners winning the Stanley Cup.

Despite having more American-based teams than Canadian-based ones throughout much of the NHL's existence (dating back to the Original Six era when it was two Canadian clubs to four American ones, and now 7 to 25 since 2021), there have been only two times in league history where none of the Canadian teams qualified for the postseason: 1970 and 2016. However, the 1992–93 Montreal Canadiens remain the last Canadian club to win the Stanley Cup, as of 2026.

The Stanley Cup playoffs MVP award, the Conn Smythe Trophy, is based on the entire NHL postseason instead of just the championship game or series, unlike the playoff MVP awards presented in the other major professional sports leagues of the United States and Canada (the Super Bowl MVP, the NBA Finals MVP, and the World Series MVP), although in its history the trophy has never been given to someone that was not in the finals. Doug Gilmour and Peter Forsberg, in 1986 and 1999, respectively, are the only players who have topped the postseason in scoring without making it to the Cup Final.

NHL players have often grown beards when their team is in the playoffs, where they do not shave until their team is eliminated or wins the Stanley Cup. The tradition was started in the 1980s by the New York Islanders and is often mirrored by fans.

At the conclusion of a playoff series, players and coaches line up and exchange handshakes with their counterparts on the opposing team, and this has been described by commentators as "one of the great traditions in sports". However, there have been rare occasions that individual players have refused to participate, such as Gerry Cheevers who left the ice without shaking hands with any of the Flyers in 1978, and Billy Smith who avoided handshakes as he was particularly passionate about losses. More recent examples of players refusing the handshake include the 1996 playoffs when several Detroit Red Wings players protested the dirty hit by the Colorado Avalanche's Claude Lemieux, and in the 2008 playoffs when Martin Brodeur refused to shake Sean Avery's hand after Avery screened him in an earlier game. At the conclusion of the 2025 Eastern Conference finals, head coaches Paul Maurice (Florida Panthers) and Rod Brind'Amour (Carolina Hurricanes) decided to have only their players exchange handshakes on the ice in view of cameras, while coaching and support staff exchanged handshakes near the bench.

It is common among players to never touch or hoist the Prince of Wales Trophy (Eastern Conference champion) or Clarence S. Campbell Bowl (Western Conference champion) after they have won the conference finals; the players feel that the Stanley Cup is the true championship trophy and thus it should be the only trophy that they should be hoisting. However, there have been many exceptions to this. Nineteen of the conference champions since 1997 have touched the trophy, of which 8 teams went on to win the Stanley Cup – Scott Stevens of the Devils in 2000 and 2003; Sidney Crosby of the Penguins in 2009, 2016, and 2017; Alexander Ovechkin of the Capitals in 2018; and Steven Stamkos of the Lightning in 2020. In recent years, the captain of the winning team poses (usually looking solemn) with the conference trophy, and sometimes, the entire team poses as well.

There are many traditions and anecdotes associated with the championship trophy, the Stanley Cup.

Because the Ice Hockey World Championships are held in the same time period as the Stanley Cup playoffs, the only NHL players who can participate in the former are those on NHL teams that have been eliminated from Stanley Cup contention. This policy has been in place since a 1977 agreement between the NHL and the International Ice Hockey Federation, which allowed Team Canada to field a team in the World Championships after an-eight year absence.

== Postseason appearances ==
Correct as of 2026 Stanley Cup playoffs

=== Appearances by active teams ===
Team	Appearances
Montreal Canadiens (Note: Original Six team)	90 (Note: Includes the three postseason appearances in the National Hockey Association prior to the formation of the NHL in 1917. The NHA, the predecessor league of the NHL, also competed for the Stanley Cup.)
Boston Bruins	78
Toronto Maple Leafs	74
Detroit Red Wings	64
Chicago Blackhawks	63
New York Rangers	63
St. Louis Blues	46
Philadelphia Flyers	41
Dallas Stars	38 (Note: Includes appearances for Minnesota North Stars (1967–68 through to 1992–93).)
Pittsburgh Penguins	38
Los Angeles Kings	34
Washington Capitals	34
Calgary Flames	31 (Note: Includes appearances for Atlanta Flames (1972–73 through to 1979–80).)
Colorado Avalanche	31 (Note: Does not include appearances in the World Hockey Association/Avco Trophy playoffs. Per the conditions of the NHL–WHA merger, the NHL does not officially recognize the WHA history, playoffs and records. Furthermore, during its existence, no WHA champion competed for the Stanley Cup.) (Note: Includes appearances for Quebec Nordiques (1979–80 through to 1994–95).)
Buffalo Sabres	30
New York Islanders	29
Vancouver Canucks	29
Edmonton Oilers	28
New Jersey Devils	25 (Note: Includes appearances for Kansas City Scouts (1974–75 through to 1975–76) and Colorado Rockies (1976–77 through to 1981–82).)
Carolina Hurricanes	21 (Note: Includes appearances for Hartford Whalers (1979–80 through to 1996–97).)
San Jose Sharks	21
Winnipeg Jets	20 (Note: Includes appearances for the original Winnipeg Jets (1979–80 through to 1995–96 and Atlanta Thrashers (1999–2000 through to 2010–11).)
Ottawa Senators	18 (Note: The modern Ottawa Senators (1992–present) are the namesake of the original Senators (1883–1934). The NHL officially treats them as two separate franchises.)
Tampa Bay Lightning	18
Nashville Predators	16
Anaheim Ducks	15
Minnesota Wild	15
Florida Panthers	11
Arizona Coyotes	9 (Note: Franchise suspended operations following the 2023–24 season.)
Vegas Golden Knights	8
Columbus Blue Jackets	6
Seattle Kraken	1
Utah Mammoth	1

== See also ==
- List of NHL playoff series
