= Dick Bulterman =

Computer scientist

- Born: 1951 (age 74–75)
- Education: Brown University
- Occupation: Computer scientist

Dick C. A. Bulterman (born 1951) is a senior researcher at the Centrum Wiskunde & Informatica (CWI) in Amsterdam, where he heads the Distributed Multimedia Languages and Interfaces theme. He is also a professor of computer science at the Vrije Universiteit in Amsterdam. Dr. Bulterman was president and CEO of FX Palo Alto Laboratory (FXPAL) from 2013 to 2015.

Dr. Bulterman has made fundamental contributions to the fields of computer science and multimedia systems development. As of 2011, he had an h-index of 25, and his publications had been cited more than 2,400 times. He has also made significant contributions to the development and specification of the Synchronized Multimedia Integration Language (SMIL).

Dr. Bulterman received a Ph.D. in computer science from Brown University (USA) in 1982. He also holds a Sc.M. in computer science from Brown University (1977) and a B.A. in economics from Hope College (1973). He is also a member of the Arts Council of the Protestant Church of Amsterdam. He was born in Amstelveen, The Netherlands, and lives with his family in Amsterdam.
