= Electrologica =

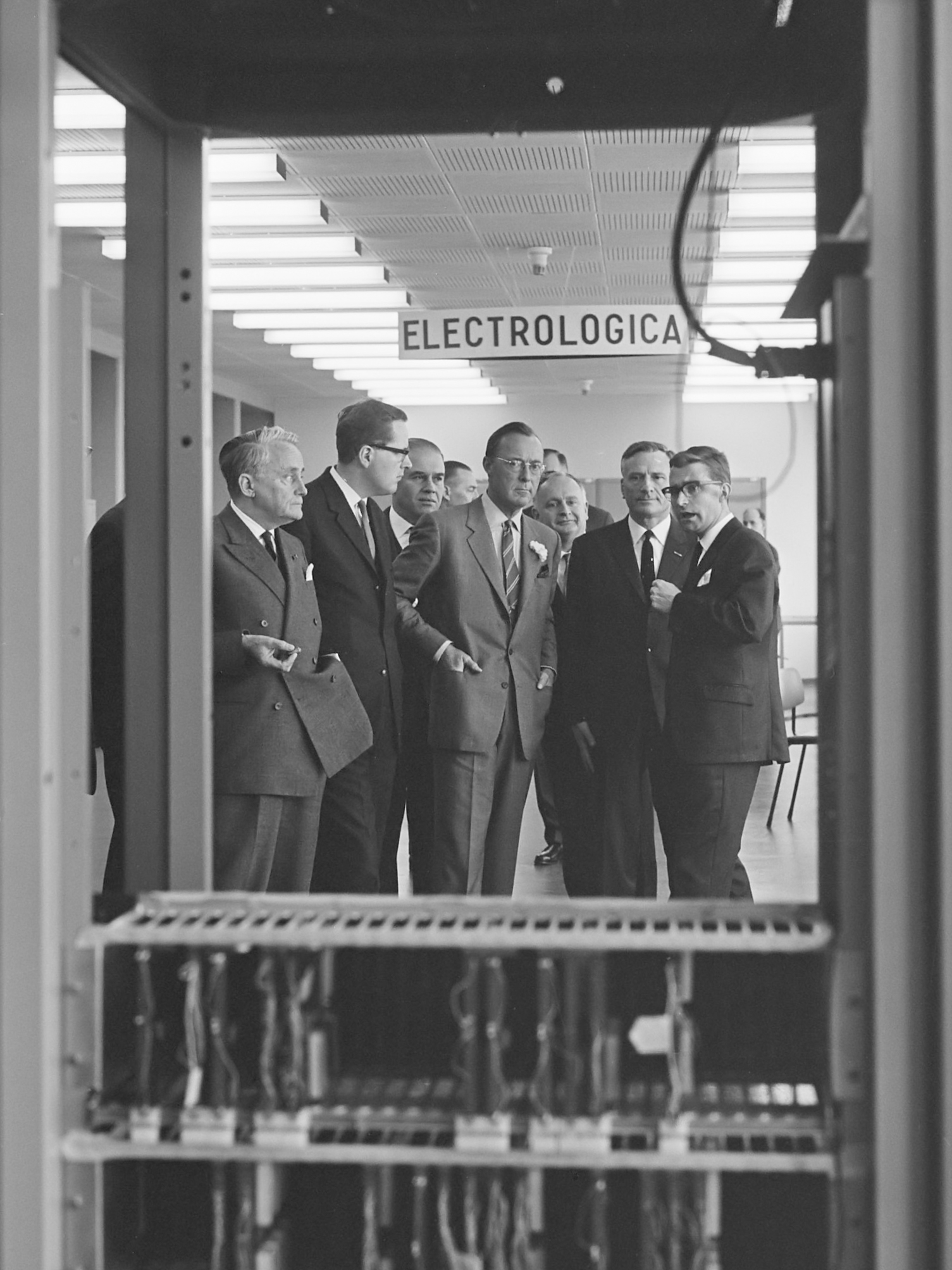
Prince Bernhard of Lippe-Biesterfeld opened Electrologica in Rijswijk. In the foreground a part of the X8. (1964)

N.V. Electrologica was a pioneering Dutch computer manufacturer from 1956 to 1968, when it was taken over by Philips.

It was started by A. van Wijngaarden, B.J. Loopstra and C.S. Scholten from the Mathematisch Centrum (Mathematical centre) in Amsterdam, when that organisation decided to spin off and commercialise its work on computers.

The most successful computers produced by Electrologica were the Electrologica X1 and the Electrologica X8. Other stripped-down versions of the X8, the X2 to X5, were less successful.

The Stichting Electrologica (“Electrologica Foundation”) is an organisation dedicated to preserving and spreading the history of computing in the Netherlands.
