= Ronald Cramer =

Dutch computer scientist (born 1968)

Ronald John Fitzgerald Cramer (born 3 February 1968 in Haarlem) is a professor at the Centrum Wiskunde & Informatica (CWI) in Amsterdam and the University of Leiden. He obtained his PhD from the University of Amsterdam in 1997. Prior to returning to the Netherlands he was at the University of Aarhus.

He is best known for his work with Victor Shoup on chosen ciphertext secure encryption in the standard model, in particular the Cramer–Shoup encryption scheme.

Cramer became a member of the Royal Netherlands Academy of Arts and Sciences in 2013. He is member of the advisory board of the German Center for Advanced Security Research Darmstadt CASED.
