= Jaap A. Zonneveld =

Jacob Anton "Jaap" Zonneveld (2 June 1924 – 22 December 2016) was a Dutch programmer who, with Edsger W. Dijkstra, wrote the first ALGOL 60 compiler. (Note: this page is developed based on the Dutch page Jaap A. Zonneveld and other sources.)

== Education ==
Zonneveld's interest in the practical application of mathematics grew in World War II in order to be able to predict the place where a grenade will land (ballistics). In 1948 he obtained his bachelor's degree in mathematics and physics; in 1954 he received a doctorate in numerical mathematics, and in 1964 a promotion with the thesis "Automatic Numerical Integration".

== Work environment ==
Zonneveld worked from 1948 at the CWI (later the Center for Mathematics and Computer Science) in Amsterdam. As a scientific assistant, he was responsible for converting calculation assignments into formulas that were then initially performed by people on a desk calculator.

In 1965, he headed a software research group at Philips' NatLab.

He retired in 1984.

== ALGOL 60 ==
In early 1960, he and Edsger W. Dijkstra started developing a compiler for the programming language ALGOL 60 day and night. They kept their notes in duplicate in separate locations to prevent them from being lost in the event of a disaster. During the development of the compiler, both developers grew beards. They agreed not to shave until compiler development was completed. Nothing was agreed as to what would happen after the completion; Dijkstra kept a beard for the rest of his life and Zonneveld shaved his off after a while. (Note: The reason for the beards is explained in a letter Dijkstra wrote to Maarten van Emden in 2000)

The compiler was completed on 24 August of that year, making it the world's first ALGOL 60 compiler. The compiler was developed for the X1 computer from Electrologica. The code is preserved in F.E.J. Kruseman Aretz's book

== Personal ==
Zonneveld met the mathematician Reina Mulder (1931-2009) at the Mathematics Center, whom he would later marry. Together they had 3 children. Jacob Anton Zonneveld died in 2016.
