= Peter Hofstee =

Dutch physicist and computer scientist (born 1962)

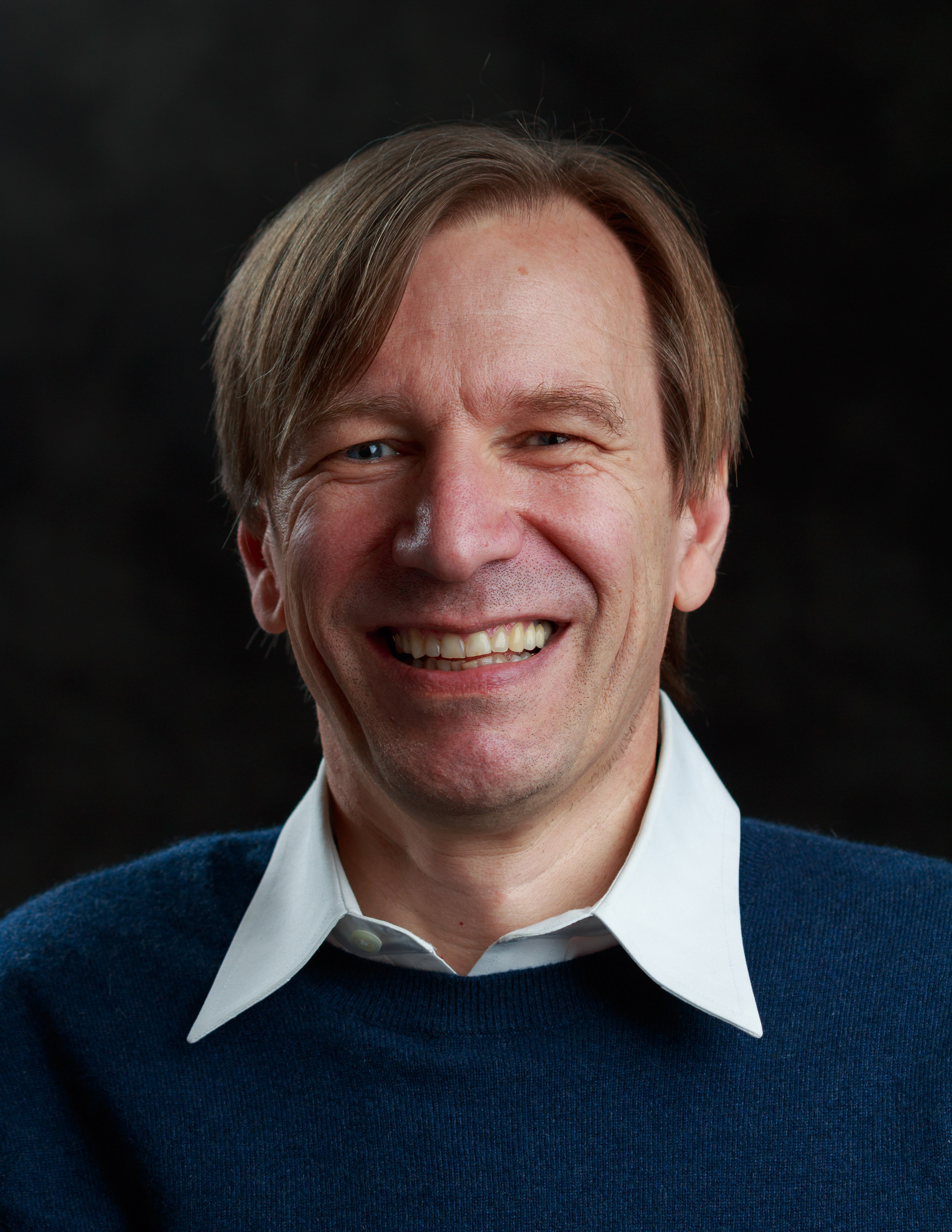
- Hofstee in 2014
- Born: 1962 (age 63–64); Groningen, Netherlands
- Education: University of Groningen; Caltech
- Scientific career
- Thesis: Synchronizing processes (1995)
- Doctoral advisor: Jan L. A. van de Snepscheut; K. Mani Chandy

Harm Peter Hofstee (born 1962) is a Dutch physicist and computer scientist who currently is a distinguished research staff member at IBM Austin, USA, and a part-time professor in Big Data Systems at Delft University of Technology, Netherlands.

== Biography ==
Hofstee was born in Groningen and obtained his master's degree in theoretical physics of the University of Groningen in 1988. He continued to study at the California Institute of Technology where he wrote a master's thesis Constructing Some Distributed Programs in 1991 and obtained a Ph.D. with a thesis titled Synchronizing Processes in 1995. He joined Caltech as a lecturer for two years and moved to IBM in the Austin, Texas Research Laboratory, where he had staff member, senior technical staff member and distinguished engineer positions.

Hofstee is best known for his contributions to Heterogeneous computing as the chief architect of the Synergistic Processor Elements in the Cell Broadband Engine processor used in the Sony PlayStation 3, and the first supercomputer to reach sustained Petaflop operation. After returning to IBM research in 2011 he has focused on optimizing the system roadmap for big data, analytics, and cloud, including the use of accelerated compute. His early research work on coherently attached reconfigurable acceleration on POWER7 paved the way for the new Coherent Accelerator Processor Interface on POWER8 through POWER10. Hofstee is an IBM Master Inventor with more than 100 issued patents.

Since 2011, Peter is leading the Big Data system design work at IBM. In March 2016, Peter was appointed as professor to the chair of Big Data Computer Systems at the Faculty of Electrical Engineering, Mathematics and Computer Science at Delft University of Technology.
