= Patrick Zonneveld =

Dutch footballer (born 1988)

Personal information
- Date of birth: 17 March 1988 (age 38)
- Place of birth: Heemskerk, Netherlands
- Height: 1.82 m (6 ft 0 in)
- Position: Goalkeeper

Youth career
- 1994–2004: ADO '20
- 2004–2006: HFC Haarlem

Senior career*
Years	Team	Apps	(Gls)
2006–2009	HFC Haarlem	23	(0)
2009–2013	ADO '20	28	(0)
2013–2016	IJsselmeervogels	66	(0)
2016–2023	AFC	126	(0)
Total		243	(0)
- * Club domestic league appearances and goals

Patrick Zonneveld (born 17 March 1988) is a Dutch former professional footballer who played as a goalkeeper.

== Career ==
=== HFC Haarlem ===
Zonneveld grew up in Heemskerk and joined the youth set-up at HFC Haarlem in 2004 from ADO '20. He was promoted to the first-team squad in 2006 as back-up to René Ponk. He made his professional debut on 26 October 2007 against Go Ahead Eagles, coming on after Ponk was sent off in the 60th minute; Haarlem won 2–1. In February 2008 head coach Jan Zoutman confirmed that the 19-year-old would take over as first-choice goalkeeper, with Ponk moving into a coaching role at the end of the season.

At the start of the 2008–09 season, Haarlem added goalkeepers Marco van Duin from Ajax and Bas van Wegen from NAC Breda. Zonneveld began as first-choice but, after a poor run of results, was replaced by Van Duin in October 2008 and later ceded the reserve spot to Van Wegen. A long-term injury then ruled him out, and he left the club in 2009, a year before Haarlem's bankruptcy.

=== Later career ===
After leaving professional football in 2009, Zonneveld returned to his former club ADO '20. In May 2012 he went on trial with PSV as potential cover for Przemysław Tytoń, but the club decided not to offer a contract. He returned to ADO '20 and, from the 2013–14 season, played as an amateur for IJsselmeervogels. After three years there he moved to AFC.
