= Algol (disambiguation) =

Algol is a star system.

Algol or ALGOL may also refer to:

== Science and technology ==
- Algol variable or Algol-type binaries, a class of eclipsing binary stars, named after its most famous example

== Programming languages ==
- ALGOL (short for Algorithmic Language), a family of computer programming languages:
  - ALGOL 58:
    - NELIAC
    - JOVIAL
    - MAD (programming language)
  - ALGOL 60:
    - Burroughs Algol
    - Elliott ALGOL
    - Dartmouth ALGOL 30
    - ALGOL W
    - Simula
    - DG/L
    - S-algol
  - ALGOL X
  - ALGOL Y
  - ALGOL 68:
    - ALGOL 68-R
    - ALGOL 68RS
    - ALGOL 68C
    - FLACC
    - ALGOL 68-RT
    - ALGAMS
    - Interactive ALGOL 68
    - ALGOL 68S

== Art and entertainment ==
- Algol (fanzine), a science fiction fanzine edited by Andrew I. Porter
- Algol (film), a 1920 science fiction film directed by Hans Werckmeister
- Algol (magazine), a 1947 Catalan avant-garde magazine
- Algol (Phantasy Star), a fictional planetary system in the Phantasy Star computer role-playing game
- Algol, a sword in the MMORPG Final Fantasy XI
- Algol, a character from the Soul series of fighting games

== Transportation ==
- MV Algol, a Swedish coastal tanker
- USS Algol (AKA-54), a U.S. Navy vessel
- SS Algol (T-AKR-287), a U.S. Navy vessel
- Algol (rocket stage), the Aerojet-produced first stage of the "Scout" rocket
- Algol-class vehicle cargo ship, currently the fastest cargo ships in the world
