= Eiiti Wada =

- 和田英一
- Born: 1 June 1931 (age 95); Japan
- Citizenship: Japan
- Education: University of Tokyo, 1955
- Known for: ALGOL N Japanese Industrial Standards (JIS) X 0208, 0212; Happy Hacking Keyboard
- Scientific career
- Institutions: University of Tokyo; Massachusetts Institute of Technology; Internet Initiative Japan
- Academic advisors: Takahasi Hidetosi
- Notable students: Tanaka Tetsuro

Eiiti Wada (和田英一, 1 June 1931) is a computer scientist and emeritus professor at the University of Tokyo and the Research Director of Internet Initiative Japan (IIJ), a computer network technology company. He is one of the creators of the Happy Hacking Keyboard.

He was involved with developing international standards in programming and informatics.

In 1968, the International Federation for Information Processing (IFIP) IFIP Working Group 2.1 on Algorithmic Languages and Calculi (WG2.1) solicited a new version of the programming language ALGOL to succeed ALGOL 60. Iwamura, Kakehi, Simauti, Wada, and Nobuo Yoneda were members of the design team of a Japanese candidate language named ALGOL N, but it was not chosen for what became ALGOL 68.

In 1972, he became a member of IFIP WG2.1, which specified, maintains, and supports ALGOL 60 and 68.

He was a member of the International Organization for Standardization (ISO), and chairperson of its National Member Body of ISO/TC97, now JTC1/SC2. There, he contributed much, especially for character encoding set standards. Later, he helped create the related Japanese Industrial Standards (JIS) X 0208, 0212.

As of 2020, he works on computer graphics for the Internet Initiative Japan (IIJ) Innovation Institute.
