= ALGOL Bulletin =

- Discipline: Computer science
- Language: English

Publication details
- History: 1959–1988

Standard abbreviations
- ISO 4: ALGOL Bull.

Indexing
- ISSN: 0084-6198

Links
- Online archive

The ALGOL Bulletin (ISSN 0084-6198) was a periodical regarding the ALGOL 60 and ALGOL 68 programming languages. It was produced under the auspices of IFIP Working Group 2.1 and published from March 1959 till August 1988. Throughout its run, the periodical produced many influential programming language proposals, while its open-dialogue nature prefigured the modern software development mailing list.

== History ==
The genesis for ALGOL Bulletin came in November 1958 at a meeting in Copenhagen between 40 representatives from large commercial and academic computing institutions in Europe. Wishing to promogulate knowledge of the ALGOL programming language to the broader computing world, the group discussed starting a newsletter. Peter Naur was tasked in February 1959 with editing and circulating the charter issue, which was published the following month, in March 1959. Naur initially published the newsletter out of his work office at Regnecentralen in Copenhagen. Within a year, the ALGOL Bulletin became the main forum for development of the ALGOL language, circulating across Europe, the United States, and even the Soviet Union. Per Jean E. Sammet, ALGOL Bulletin remained more popular in Europe, while across the Atlantic the Communications of the ACM was the periodical of choice for most American ALGOL enthusiasts.

Publication of the ALGOL Bulletin was ceased between June 1962 and May 1964, shortly after the IFIP Working Group 2.1 was founded in April 1962 to support and maintain ALGOL 60, the most popular specification of ALGOL. Development of ALGOL heretofore had been largely mediated through informal correspondence in the ALGOL Bulletin, but external pressures to create a standards body such as the IFIP WG 2.1 led to the temporary collapse of the ALGOL Bulletin.

The ALGOL Bulletin was revived in May 1964, operated under the auspices of the IFIP WG 2.1. Duncan Fraser took over as editor of the periodical from Naur. The revived ALGOL Bulletin was published at irregular intervals until the final issue in August 1988.
