= Roland Carl Backhouse =

British computer scientist and mathematician

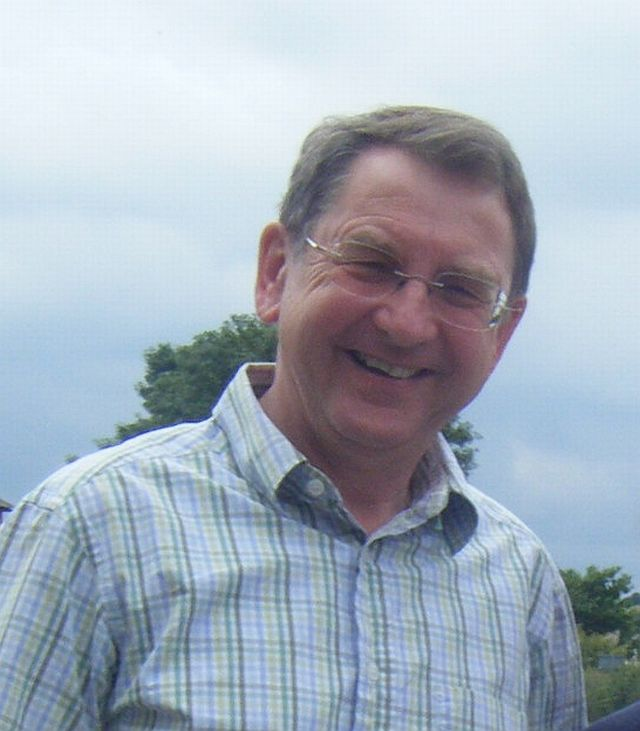
- Roland Backhouse, 2009
- Born: 18 August 1948 (age 78); Middlesbrough, England
- Citizenship: Great Britain; Netherlands
- Education: Churchill College, Cambridge; Imperial College London
- Known for: Program construction Algorithmic problem solving ALGOL
- Spouse: Hilary
- Children: 3
- Scientific career
- Fields: Computer science, mathematics
- Workplaces: Royal Aircraft Establishment; Heriot-Watt University; University of Essex; University of Groningen; Eindhoven University of Technology; University of Nottingham
- Doctoral advisor: Jim Cunningham
- Website: www.cs.nott.ac.uk/~psarb2

Roland Carl Backhouse (born 18 August 1948) is a British computer scientist and mathematician. He is professor emeritus of computing science at the University of Nottingham.

== Early life and education ==
Backhouse was born and raised in the Thorntree district of Middlesbrough, an industrial town in the north-east of England. In 1959, he won a place at the then all-male Acklam Hall Grammar School before going on to Churchill College, Cambridge, in 1966. His doctorate (Ph.D.) was completed under the supervision of Jim Cunningham at Imperial College London.

== Career ==
Backhouse's career has included Royal Aircraft Establishment (1969–1970), Heriot-Watt University (1973–1982), University of Essex (1982–1986). He was formerly Professor of Computer Science at the University of Groningen (1986–1990) and Eindhoven University of Technology (1990–1999) in the Netherlands, before his position at the University of Nottingham.

He was a member of the International Federation for Information Processing (IFIP) IFIP Working Group 2.1 on Algorithmic Languages and Calculi, which specified, maintains, and supports the programming languages ALGOL 60 and ALGOL 68.

== Personal life ==
Backhouse is married to Hilary, née Mitchell. They have three sons, Kevin, Andrew, and David.

== Academic interests ==
His research interests lie in the mathematics of program construction and algorithmic problem solving. Together with Jan L. A. van de Snepscheut (1953—1994), he began the biennial series of conferences on the Mathematics of Program Construction, the first of which was held in 1989.

== Publications ==
=== Books ===
- Backhouse, Roland (2011). Algorithmic problem solving. Chichester: Wiley. ISBN 978-0-470-68453-5.
- Backhouse, Roland (2003). Program construction: calculating implementations from specifications. Chichester: Wiley. ISBN 978-0-470-84882-1.
- Backhouse, Roland (1986). Program construction and verification. Englewood Cliffs N.J.: Prentice-Hall International. ISBN 978-0-13-729153-3.
- Backhouse, Roland (1979). Syntax of programming languages. Prentice-Hall International series in computer science. Englewood Cliffs, N.J.: Prentice-Hall International. ISBN 978-0-13-879999-1.

=== Books edited ===
- Backhouse, Roland; Gibbons, Jeremy; Hinze, Ralph; Jeuring, Johan, eds. (2007). Datatype-generic programming: international spring school, SSDGP 2006, Nottingham, UK 24–27 April 2006, revised lectures. International Spring School on Datatype-Generic Programming. Berlin: Springer. ISBN 978-3-540-76785-5.
- Backhouse, Roland; Gibbons, Jeremy, eds. (2003). Generic programming: advanced lectures [lectures presented at a Summer School on Generic Programming held at the University of Oxford in August 2002]. Berlin: Springer. ISBN 978-3-540-20194-6.
- Backhouse, Roland; Crole, Roy L.; Gibbons, Jeremy, eds. (2002). Algebraic and coalgebraic methods in the mathematics of program construction: international summer school and workshop Oxford, UK, 10–14 April 2000, revised lectures. Berlin; New York: Springer. ISBN 978-3-540-43613-3.
- Backhouse, Roland; Oliveira, Jose N., eds. (2000). Mathematics of Program Construction 2000. Berlin; New York: Springer. ISBN 978-3-540-67727-7.

=== Selected papers ===
- Backhouse, R. C.; Carre, B. A. (1975). "Regular algebra applied to path-finding problems". Journal of the Institute of Mathematics and Its Applications. 15 (2): 161–186. doi:10.1093/imamat/15.2.161.
- Backhouse, R.; Jansson, P.; Jeuring, J.; Meertens, L. (1999). "Generic Programming". Advanced Functional Programming. 3rd International School on Advanced Functional Programming (AFP 98),12–19 September 1998. Lecture Notes in Computer Science. Vol. 1608. pp. 28–115. doi:10.1007/10704973_2. ISBN 978-3-540-66241-9.
- Doornbos, H.; Backhouse, R.; vanderWoude, J. (June 1997). "A calculational approach to mathematical induction". Theoretical Computer Science. 179 (1–2): 103–135. doi:10.1016/s0304-3975(96)00154-5.
- Backhouse, R. (2002). "Galois Connections and Fixed Point Calculus". Algebraic and Coalgebraic Methods in the Mathematics of Program Construction. International Summer School and Workshop on Algebraic and Coalgebraic Methods in the Mathematics of Program Construction, 10–14 April 2000. Lecture Notes in Computer Science. Vol. 2297. pp. 89–148. doi:10.1007/3-540-47797-7_4. ISBN 978-3-540-43613-3.
- Doornbos, H.; Backhouse, R. (1996). Reductivity. 3rd International Conference on the Mathematics of Program Construction, 17–21 July 1995. Science of Computer Programming. Vol. 26, no. 1–3. pp. 217–236. doi:10.1016/0167-6423(95)00027-5.
