= Tom Maibaum =

Computer scientist

- Education: B.Sc., University of Toronto (1970); Ph.D., University of London (1974)
- Awards: Fellow of the Royal Society of Arts
- Scientific career
- Fields: Computer science
- Workplaces: Imperial College, London; King's College London; McMaster University
- Website: www.cas.mcmaster.ca/~maibaum

Thomas Stephen Edward Maibaum is a computer scientist.

Maibaum has a Bachelor of Science (B.Sc.) undergraduate degree in pure mathematics from the University of Toronto, Canada (1970), and a Doctor of Philosophy (Ph.D.) in computer science from Queen Mary and Royal Holloway Colleges, University of London, England (1974).

Maibaum has held academic posts at Imperial College, London, King's College London (UK) and McMaster University (Canada). His research interests have concentrated on the theory of specification, together with its application in different contexts, in the general area of software engineering.

From 1996 to 2005, he was involved with developing international standards in programming and informatics, as a member of the International Federation for Information Processing (IFIP) IFIP Working Group 2.1 on Algorithmic Languages and Calculi, which specified, maintains, and supports the programming languages ALGOL 60 and ALGOL 68.

He is a Fellow of the Institution of Engineering and Technology and the Royal Society of Arts.
