= ALGOL N =

- Paradigms: Multi-paradigm: procedural, imperative, structured
- Family: ALGOL
- Designed by: Nobuo Yoneda, Eiiti Wada, S. Igarashi, T. lwamura, K. Sakuma, T. Shimauti, T. Shimuzu, S. Takasu
- First appeared: 1969; 56 years ago
- Typing discipline: Static, strong
- Scope: Lexical

Influenced by
- ALGOL 60, ALGOL 68

ALGOL N (N for Nippon – Japan in Japanese) is the name of a successor programming language to ALGOL 60, designed in Japan with the goal of being as simple as ALGOL 60 but as powerful as ALGOL 68. The language was proposed by Nobuo Yoneda. ALGOL N tried to use extensibility to solve the problem that language designers faced when trying to make an inextensible language for all domains, or having to make many domain-specific languages (DSLs), one for each domain. It avoided type conversion (coercion) while not making things more difficult for programmers.
