= Sintsov =

Notable people with surname Sintsov (Cyrillic: Синцов) include:

- Anton Sintsov (born 1985), Russian road and mountain bike racer
- Dmitrii Sintsov (1867–1946), Russian and Soviet mathematician

Notable people with surname Sintzoff include:

- Michel Sintzoff (1938–2010), Belgian mathematician and computer scientist
