= Cornelis H. A. Koster =

Dutch computer scientist (1943–2013)

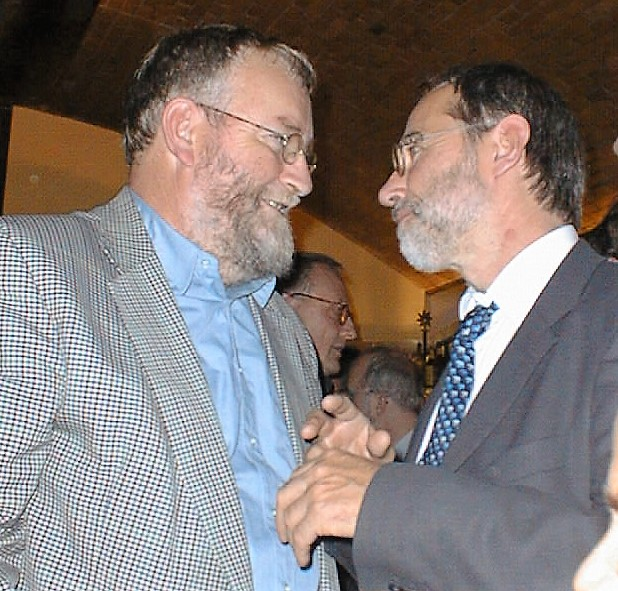
- Koster (left) in 2000
- Born: Cornelis Hermanus Antonius Koster; 13 July 1943; Haarlem, Netherlands
- Died: 21 March 2013 (aged 69)
- Education: University of Amsterdam
- Known for: ALGOL 68
- Scientific career
- Fields: Computer science
- Workplaces: Mathematisch Centrum; Technische Universität Berlin; Radboud University Nijmegen

Cornelis Hermanus Antonius "Kees" Koster (13 July 1943 – 21 March 2013) was a Dutch computer scientist who was a professor in the Department of Informatics at the Radboud University Nijmegen in the Netherlands.

== Biography ==
Koster was born on 13 July 1943, in Haarlem, and after World War II, his family moved to Jakarta. At age 11 he returned to the Netherlands on his own. After his study at the University of Amsterdam he worked at the Mathematisch Centrum (MC) in Amsterdam under Adriaan van Wijngaarden. There, he was one of the editors of the original Report on the Algorithmic Language ALGOL 68, being responsible for the design of ALGOL 68's transput.

Koster became involved with developing international standards in programming and informatics, as a member of the International Federation for Information Processing (IFIP) IFIP Working Group 2.1 on Algorithmic Languages and Calculi, which specified, maintains, and supports the programming languages ALGOL 60 and 68.

Koster is the creator of the original Compiler Description Language (CDL), and of affix grammars, which are a variant of Van Wijngaarden grammars. In a sense, CDL is a deterministic executable affix grammar, while Prolog is a non-deterministic executable affix grammar; a link acknowledged by the implementors of the original Prolog interpreter.

In 1972, Koster moved to Berlin to initiate an informatics course at Technische Universität Berlin. In 1977, he became the first Professor of Informatics at the Radboud University Nijmegen. He died on 21 March 2013, aged 69, in a motorcycle accident.
