= Barry J. Mailloux =

Barry James Mailloux
- Born: 1939 or 1940; Leamington, Ontario
- Died: May 26, 1982 (aged 41–42)
- Other name: BJ
- Education: University of Alberta (M.Sc., 1963); Mathematisch Centrum (Ph.D., 1968)
- Scientific career
- Fields: Computer science
- Institutions: Mathematisch Centrum; University of Alberta
- Theses: Numerical Solution of Differential Equations (1963); On the implementation of ALGOL 68 (1969)
- Academic advisors: Adriaan van Wijngaarden
- Notable students: Chris Thomson

Barry James Mailloux (c. 1940 – 26 May 1982) was a Canadian computer scientist.

== Career ==
Mailloux obtained his Master of Science (M.Sc.) in numerical analysis in 1963. From 1966, he studied at Amsterdam's Mathematisch Centrum under Adriaan van Wijngaarden, earning a Doctor of Philosophy (Ph.D.) in 1968.

He was the "first et al editor" of the original Report on the Algorithmic Language ALGOL 68, and the Revised Report on the Algorithmic Language ALGOL 68.

He was a member of the International Federation for Information Processing (IFIP) IFIP Working Group 2.1, which specified, maintains, and supports the programming languages ALGOL 60 and ALGOL 68.

In 1968, he returned to the University of Alberta as an assistant professor in the Department of Computing Science. His work on ALGOL 68 made the university a world center for ALGOL 68-related activity.

Mailloux's student Chris Thomson and friend Colin Broughton established Chion Corporation, which produced the Full Language Algol 68 Checkout Compiler (FLACC). FLACC proved Mailloux's contention that ALGOL 68 could indeed be implemented, contrary to the public complaints from some, such as Edsger Dijkstra.
