= Periphere Computer Systeme =

German UNIX-based computer manufacturer

Periphere Computer Systeme (PCS) was founded in Munich by the brothers Georg and Eberhard Färber in 1969. In the 1980s and 1990s it was a manufacturer of a line of UNIX-based workstations called "Cadmus". Their flavor of System V was called MUNIX; it was the first port of System V performed in Germany. They also developed a networking protocol that was based on the Newcastle Connection ("UNIXes of the World Unite!") and dubbed MUNIX/net, at the time competing with Sun Microsystems' NFS.

In addition to UNIX computers, PCS also manufactured industrial terminals.

In 1985, PCS founded a US daughter company named Cadmus Computer Systems to distribute the workstations in the US.

Eventually, PCS was bought out by Mannesmann-Kienzle, which in turn was bought out by Ken Olsen to become part of DEC, Digital Equipment Corporation. The main driver for the buyouts was a client/server ERP product developed by a dynamic young team at Mannesmann Kienzle Software, competing with SAP R/3. Ken Olson had planned to diversify the corporation, but was ousted by shareholders who did not share his vision of no longer relying on the more and more commoditized computer systems sale and rather jump on the ERP bandwagon early on. One of the reasons for naming DECs last line of CPUs (AlphaAXP) was that they were intended to be sold as the Alpha and the Omega (codename for the ERP system).

As a result, Digital-Kienzle, including its PCS subsidiary, entered into a staff buy-out of the company, in part sponsored by some of the German states. The timing of this decision pulled the financial bottom out of the whole setup in terms of the ERP system that was just getting a decent foothold in the market. As a result, there is not much left to be said or heard about said ERP system. In the late 1980s, whenever Mannesmann-Kienzle's representatives were speaking at conferences prior to SAP's presenters, SAP during Q&A usually had to state that they were planning to be in their development of R/3 where the "Omega"-team already had arrived at.

One of the more prominent figures of the former PCS might be Jürgen Gulbins, who authored several books on Unix and related tools, as well as Jordan Hubbard, who spent several years at PCS (in the X11 group) before departing for Ireland, where he co-founded the FreeBSD project.

== See also ==
- Super-root (a feature of MUNIX)
- Karlsruhe Accurate Arithmetic (for Cadmus computer)
- Pascal-SC (for Cadmus computer)
