= IFIP Working Group 2.1 =

IFIP Working Group 2.1 on Algorithmic Languages and Calculi is a working group of the International Federation for Information Processing (IFIP).

IFIP WG 2.1 was formed as the body responsible for the continued support and maintenance of the programming language ALGOL 60. The Modified Report on the Algorithmic Language ALGOL 60 and the ALGOL 68 programming language were produced by WG 2.1.

As of 2 March 2011, its scope is:

- Study of calculation of programs from specifications
- Design of notations for such calculation
- Formulation of algorithm theories, using such notations
- Investigation of software support for program derivation
- Continuing responsibility for ALGOL 60 and ALGOL 68

== History ==
=== Formation ===
Soon after the publication of the original ALGOL 60 Report in 1960, issues arose that needed some form of authoritative resolution. ALGOL 60 had been chosen by leading scientific journal Communications of the ACM as its language for algorithms, then an important part of the items published in the Communications. Computer manufacturers and academic groups were laboring to produce implementations. There were issues that needed clarification, such as ambiguities and errors in the Report. Another urgent issue was the absence of even basic input/output (I/O) facilities.

The authors of the ALGOL 60 Report met in Rome, Italy, in April 1962 to resolve most of the ambiguities and errors known at the time, resulting in the Revised Report on the Algorithmic Language ALGOL 60. During that meeting, the authors decided to institutionalize the responsibility for the continued support and maintenance of ALGOL 60 by transferring it to the young international IFIP organization.

To this end, IFIP established a working group under its Technical Committee 2 on Programming. The initial membership consisted largely of most of the original authors, with the addition of several members responsible for ALGOL 60 implementations. IFIP WG 2.1 held its first meeting in August 1962 in Munich, Germany.

=== ALGOL 68 ===
When ALGOL 60 was designed, its intended scope of use was similar to that of FORTRAN: largely the field of numerical analysis or computing. IFIP WG 2.1 embarked on the design of a successor to the ALGOL 60 programming language, code-named ALGOL X, with a much wider application scope, including nonnumerical programming, areas better served by languages like COBOL and Lisp than by ALGOL 60. Among several competing initial designs, including a proposal by Niklaus Wirth that eventually led to ALGOL W, the Working Group chose that by Aad van Wijngaarden, ultimately leading to ALGOL 68.

IFIP WG 2.1 decided to adopt the design in December 1968 during a stormy meeting, once again held in Munich. However, there was considerable opposition among the members, led by Edsger Dijkstra, expressed in a Minority Report. This led to a split in the group and the formation of a new working group, IFIP Working Group 2.3 on Programming Methodology.

== Notable members, former and current ==
WG 2.1 has, and has had, many members. Some are the subject of Wikipedia articles:

- Roland Carl Backhouse
- Friedrich L. Bauer
- Richard Bird
- Stephen R. Bourne
- John Darlington
- Robert Dewar
- Edsger W. Dijkstra
- Andrey Ershov
- Robert W. Floyd
- Jeremy Gibbons
- David Gries
- Eric Hehner
- Tony Hoare
- Zhenjiang Hu
- Charles Katz
- Cornelis H. A. Koster
- Peter Landin
- Charles H. Lindsey
- Yanhong Annie Liu
- Peter Lucas
- Conor McBride
- John McCarthy
- Tom Maibaum
- Barry J. Mailloux
- Lambert Meertens
- Carroll Morgan
- Peter Naur
- Maurice Nivat
- Manfred Paul
- John E. L. Peck
- Willem van der Poel
- Brian Randell
- Douglas T. Ross
- Heinz Rutishauser
- Klaus Samelson
- Jacob T. Schwartz
- Micha Sharir
- Michel Sintzoff
- David Turner
- Robert Uzgalis
- Bernard Vauquois
- Eiiti Wada
- Joseph Henry Wegstein
- Adriaan van Wijngaarden
- Niklaus Wirth
- Mike Woodger
- Nobuo Yoneda

== See also ==
- Bemer, R. W. (1969). "A politico-social history of ALGOL". In Halpern, M. I.; Shaw, C. J. (eds.). Annual Review in Automatic Programming. Vol. 5. Pergamon Press.
- Lindsey, Charles H. (1996). "A History of ALGOL 68". In Bergin, T. J.; Gibson, R. G. (eds.). History of Programming Languages, Volume 2. ACM Press. ISBN 0-201-89502-1.
