= Maarten van Emden =

Dutch-Canadian computer scientist (1937–2023)

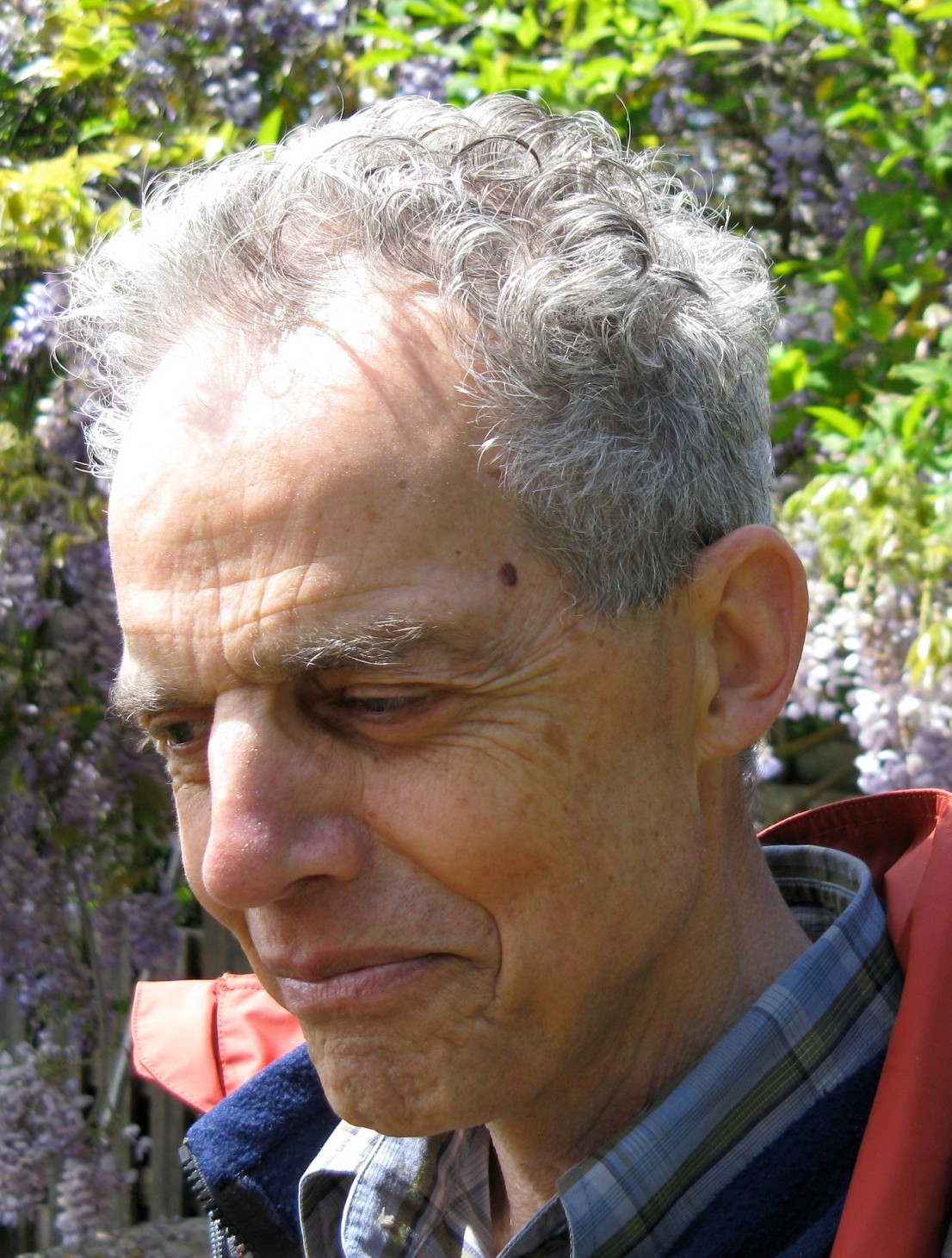
- Van Emden in Victoria, British Columbia, in 2008
- Born: Maarten Herman van Emden; December 31, 1937; Velp, Netherlands
- Died: January 4, 2023 (aged 85); Victoria, British Columbia, Canada
- Citizenship: Netherlands; Canada
- Education: University of Amsterdam
- Known for: Logic programming Prolog; Artificial intelligence
- Scientific career
- Fields: Computer science Logic
- Workplaces: University of Victoria; University of Waterloo
- Thesis: An analysis of complexity (1971)
- Doctoral advisor: Adriaan van Wijngaarden

Maarten Herman van Emden (December 31, 1937 – January 4, 2023) was a Dutch-Canadian mathematician and computer scientist whose research in the foundations of logic programming and constraint logic programming was highly influential.

== Early years ==
Van Emden was born in Velp, the Netherlands, and his early childhood was spent mostly in the Dutch East Indies. He served his national military service in 1959–1960, both as pilot and commissioned officer. He attended national flight training school and worked for KLM as a pilot from 1960 to 1963.

== Education ==
Van Emden completed an MSc from the Delft University of Technology in 1966 and a PhD in computer science from the University of Amsterdam in 1971. His dissertation, "An Analysis of Complexity", was on information theory and data analysis. His thesis supervisor was Adriaan van Wijngaarden, who also supervised another notable Dutch computer scientist Edsger W. Dijkstra.

== Career ==
Van Emden spent 1971-1972 as a postdoctoral fellow at the IBM Thomas J. Watson Research Center and then joined the Machine Intelligence group at the University of Edinburgh as a research fellow under Donald Michie. In 1975, he immigrated to Canada to join the faculty at the University of Waterloo. He moved to the University of Victoria in 1987. His visiting fellow positions include University of Edinburgh in 1980, Imperial College (UK) in 1982–1983, and NWO (Netherlands) in 2000–2001.

In collaboration with Robert Kowalski, Van Emden developed the fixpoint semantics of Horn clauses, which underpin the logical semantics of logic programming. He further researched on software verification and correctness, and constraint satisfaction, along with interval arithmetic and interval propagation . He wrote an advice-taking Prolog program for certain chess endgames.

Between 2008-2019 Van Emden wrote a collection of essays on the practice of programming and the history and philosophy of computing on a blog entitled A Programmer's Place.
