= John E. L. Peck =

South African Canadian computer scientist (1918–2013)

John Edward Lancelot Peck
- Born: August 14, 1918; South Africa
- Died: November 6, 2013 (aged 95)
- Education: B.Sc., M.Sc.; University of Natal; M.Sc.; University of Natal
- Known for: Topology; ALGOL 68
- Scientific career
- Fields: Mathematics; Computer science
- Institutions: Brown University; University of Natal; University of New Brunswick; McGill University; University of Calgary; University of British Columbia

John Edward Lancelot Peck (14 August 1918 – 6 November 2013) was the first permanent Head of Department of Computer Science at the University of British Columbia (UBC). He remained the Head of Department from 1969 to 1977.

He was one of the editors of the original Report on the Algorithmic Language ALGOL 68 and a contributing editor to the Revised Report on the Algorithmic Language ALGOL 68. He has written an article outlining his personal account of being part of the design team. Before assuming his role as the Head of Computer Science at the University of British Columbia, he was the first Head of the University of Calgary's newly built Math Department.

Many of his publications are indexed on the DBLP computer science bibliography site, and the Computer History Museum, software preservation group site.

== Early years ==
John spent his early years in South Africa receiving a Bachelor of Science (B.Sc.) in Mathematics and Physics at the University of Natal, South Africa, after which he received a Master of Science (M.Sc.) in mathematics. His first teaching position was lecturing in mathematics. In 1946, he took a scholarship to Yale University, where he obtained a Doctor of Philosophy (Ph.D.) in 1950, with a thesis on the topological semigroups. He then went on to teach at Brown University for three years before returning to the University of Natal. In 1955, he emigrate to Canada and taught at the University of New Brunswick followed by four years at McGill University. He left McGill to form the Mathematics Department at the University of Calgary.

His interest in computers began in 1959, when he responded to a request from McGill's mathematics department to learn to program a Datatron, and his first programs were written for it. As a result of this experience, he visited the University of Oklahoma to learn to program an IBM 650, another drum memory machine, which had an optimizing assembler named SOAP. The programming language Fortran was emerging then, as the translation was from Fortran to Internal Translator (IT) to SOAP to object code. At the time, his programming was in assembly code. In 1959, when McGill acquired an IBM 650, he was one of the few individuals who could program it. Around 1961, after arriving at the University of Calgary, the university acquired an IBM 1620. He became the computing centre director, while performing his duties as head of the mathematics department. On this machine, he explored list processing methods, and then used these to write a compiler for the language ALGOL 60. This led to an invitation to attend the International Federation for Information Processing (IFIP) congress as Canada's representative. At this time, revisions were being made to ALGOL 60. He became the Canadian member of the IFIP Working Group 2.1 on Algorithmic Languages and Calculi, which specified, supports, and maintains the languages ALGOL 60 and 68.

After his time as department head, he continued to teach at UBC, circa 1978–1979. He was seen arriving at the computer centre's terminal room early morning each weekend on his old-fashioned solid bicycle, beating many graduate students who headed to the terminal room to use the Amdahl mainframe computer in less crowded morning hours. He arrived around 9:00 o'clock, weather permitting. Presumably he was working on an ALGOL 68 compiler system. That a professor of his status was sitting and typing at the terminal at each weekend gave some unspoken lessons to the future researchers.
