= Charles H. Lindsey =

British computer scientist (1931–2023)

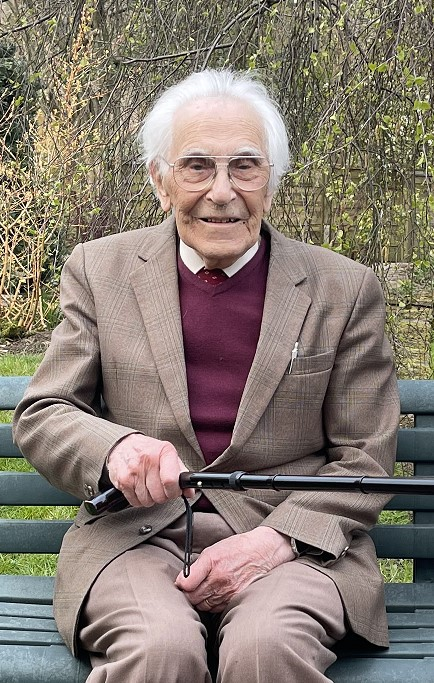
- Born: Charles Hodgson Lindsey; 18 Apr 1931
- Died: 13 Feb 2023, age 91
- Citizenship: United Kingdom
- Known for: Revised Report on Algol 68
- Scientific career
- Fields: Computer science
- Institutions: Mathematical Laboratory, Cambridge; Ferranti/ICT; Department of Computer Science, University of Manchester
- Website: Official website archived from the original on 8 November 2022

Charles Hodgson Lindsey (18 April 1931 – 13 February 2023) was a British computer scientist, known for his involvement with the programming language ALGOL 68.

== Career ==
After completing his Ph.D. at Cambridge University, sponsored by Ferranti and supervised by Maurice Wilkes, and later working on the EDSAC computer, Lindsey began his career at Ferranti at West Gorton in Manchester, becoming project leader for the Ferranti Orion. In 1967 he was appointed Lecturer in the Department of Computer Science at Manchester University, where he remained for the rest of his career.

== Algol 68 ==
He was an editor of the Revised Report on Algol 68, and co-wrote An Informal Introduction to Algol 68. The latter was notable because it was written so that it could be read "horizontally", in the normal manner, or "vertically", starting with section 1.1, then 2.1, then 3.1, etc., before going back to section 1.2, then 2.2, and so on, depending on how a reader wanted to learn the language. He also wrote a history of ALGOL 68.

He was responsible for the research implementation of ALGOL 68 for the experimental MU5 computer (1974–1982) at Manchester University, and maintained an implementation of the language subset ALGOL 68S.

== Other computing work ==
He worked on international standards in programming and informatics, as a member of the International Federation for Information Processing's Working Group 2.1 on Algorithmic Languages and Calculi, which specified, maintains, and supports ALGOL 60 and ALGOL 68. In 1977 he received the IFIP Silver Core Award.

He was involved in the Internet Engineering Task Force (IETF) Working Group which produced the two RFC standards RFC 5536 and RFC 5537, which he co-authored, which specified the Usenet distributed discussion system. He was also a member of the IETF DKIM Working Group which produced a scheme for signing email headers.

== Computer conservation ==
He was a member of the Computer Conservation Society, North West Branch, and led the team restoring Douglas Hartree's Differential Analyser at Manchester Museum of Science and Technology. In 2015 Lindsey was awarded the British Computer Society Certificate of Appreciation for his volunteer work.
