= Andrey Terekhov =

Russian IT developer (1949–2025)

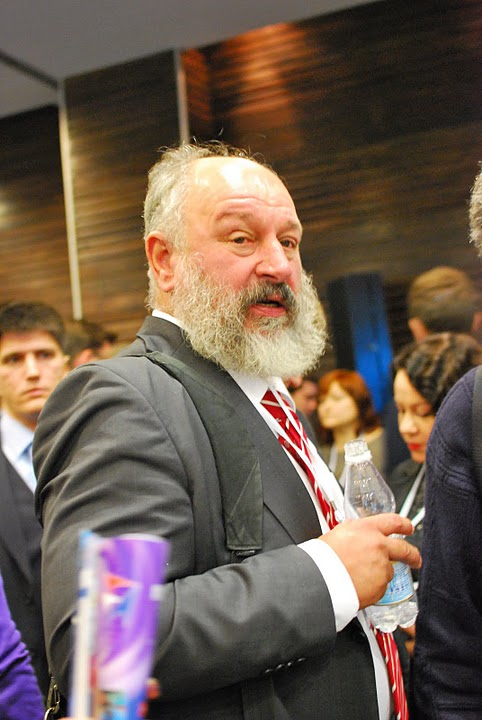
Terekhov in 2011

Andrey Nikolaevich Terekhov (Russian: Андрей Николаевич Терехов; 3 September 1949 – 31 July 2025) was a Russian mathematician and programmer.

== Education ==
Terekhov studied Computer Science at Leningrad State University, graduating with Honors. He had a Doctorate in Physical Mathematical Sciences.

== Memberships ==
Terekhov was a member of ACM and the IEEE Computer Society. In 2004 he became Chairman of the Board of Directors of RUSSOFT.

== Research positions ==
In 1971, Terekhov began working at Leningrad State University as a junior research associate. He was ultimately promoted to head of System-Programming there. In 1984 he was appointed Deputy Director at Zvezda and Krasnaya Zarya. Seven years later he founded and became Director of a smart software solutions company Lanit-Tercom and in 1996 founded and led the Software Engineering Chair of St. Petersburg State University.

In 2002 Terekhov was behind the organization and guidance of the Scientific Research Institute of Information Technology of St. Petersburg State University.

== Death ==
Terekhov died on 31 July 2025, at the age of 75.
