= Roy H. Campbell =

English-born computer scientist

- Born: London, UK
- Education: University of Sussex, Newcastle University
- Scientific career
- Fields: Computer science
- Workplaces: University of Illinois at Urbana–Champaign
- Thesis: Path expressions: a technique for specifying process synchronization (1976)
- Doctoral advisor: Hugh C. Lauer, Brian Randell

Roy Harold Campbell is a computer scientist and the Sohaib and Sara Abbasi Professor emeritus at University of Illinois at Urbana–Champaign and director of the Assured Cloud Computing University Center of Excellence. Campbell is best known for his work in operating systems, parallel computing, and multimedia on the internet.

== Early life and education ==
Roy Campbell grew up outside of London, UK; his father died when Campbell was young and his mother ran a wholesale-cloth business. He received a B.Sc. in mathematics from the University of Sussex in 1969. He then completed an M.Sc. in 1972 and Ph.D. in 1976, both in computer science, from the University of Newcastle upon Tyne. His Ph.D. was advised by Hugh C. Lauer and Brian Randell, entitled 'Path Expressions: A technique for specifying process synchronization'.

Campbell moved to the United States in 1976 with his wife Ann Campbell to pursue an academic posting at UIUC.

== Career ==
Campbell joined the faculty at the University of Illinois at Urbana–Champaign (UIUC) in 1976. There he led a research group in the department of computer science, the Systems Research Group, until his retirement in 2019. One of Campbell's initial areas of interest was multimedia on the internet, a field which has now given rise to, among other areas, the Internet of Things. In the early days of multimedia on the internet, Campbell worked on Vosiac internet video distribution system. Campbell has also made contributions in the areas of distributed computing, including work operating systems, a foundation field, as well as work in parallel computing and cloud computing security.

In 2004, Campbell was named the Sohaib and Sara Abbasi Professor in computer science at UIUC. In 2005, Campbell was recognized as an IEEE Fellow. From 2008 to 2013, Campbell served as the director of the Assured Cloud Computing University Center of Excellence at UIUC, and Campbell authored the textbook 'Assured Cloud Computing'.

Through his career Campbell was active in his service to the administration of the UIUC computer science department and other scientific society administration, receiving the ACM Recognition of Service Award in 2008 and 2010. Campbell is an active donor to the University of Illinois Department of Computer Science and the Krannert Center for the Performing Arts on UIUC campus.
