= Yoneda product =

Pairing in algebra between ext groups of modules

In algebra, the Yoneda product (named after Nobuo Yoneda) is the pairing between Ext groups of modules:
$$\operatorname{Ext}^n(M, N) \otimes \operatorname{Ext}^m(L, M) \to \operatorname{Ext}^{n+m}(L, N)$$
induced by
$$\operatorname{Hom}(N, M) \otimes \operatorname{Hom}(M, L) \to \operatorname{Hom}(N, L),\, f \otimes g \mapsto g \circ f.$$

Specifically, for an element $\xi \in \operatorname{Ext}^n(M, N)$, thought of as an extension
$$\xi :  0 \rightarrow N \rightarrow E_0 \rightarrow \cdots \rightarrow E_{n-1} \rightarrow M \rightarrow 0 ,$$
and similarly
$$\rho : 0 \rightarrow M \rightarrow F_0\rightarrow \cdots \rightarrow F_{m-1} \rightarrow L \rightarrow 0 \in \operatorname{Ext}^m(L, M),$$
we form the Yoneda (cup) product
$$\xi \smile \rho : 0 \rightarrow N \rightarrow E_0 \rightarrow \cdots \rightarrow E_{n-1} \rightarrow F_0 \rightarrow \cdots \rightarrow F_{m-1} \rightarrow L \rightarrow 0 \in \operatorname{Ext}^{m + n}(L, N).$$

Note that the middle map $E_{n-1} \rightarrow F_0$ factors through the given maps to $M$.

We extend this definition to include $m, n = 0$ using the usual functoriality of the $\operatorname{Ext}^*(\cdot,\cdot)$ groups.

== Applications ==
=== Ext Algebras ===
Given a commutative ring $R$ and a module $M$, the Yoneda product defines a product structure on the groups $\text{Ext}^\bullet(M,M)$, where $\text{Ext}^0(M,M) = \text{Hom}_R(M,M)$ is generally a non-commutative ring. This can be generalized to the case of sheaves of modules over a ringed space, or ringed topos.

=== Grothendieck duality ===
In Grothendieck's duality theory of coherent sheaves on a projective scheme $i:X \hookrightarrow \mathbb{P}^n_k$ of pure dimension $r$ over an algebraically closed field $k$, there is a pairing
$$\text{Ext}^p_{\mathcal{O}_X}(\mathcal{O}_X, \mathcal{F}) \times
\text{Ext}^{r-p}_{\mathcal{O}_X}(\mathcal{F},\omega_X^\bullet) \to k$$
where $\omega_X$ is the dualizing complex $\omega_X = \mathcal{Ext}_{\mathcal{O}_\mathbb{P}}^{n-r}(i_*\mathcal{F},\omega_{\mathbb{P}})$ and $\omega_{\mathbb{P}} = \mathcal{O}_\mathbb{P}(-(n+1))$ given by the Yoneda pairing.

=== Deformation theory ===
The Yoneda product is useful for understanding the obstructions to a deformation of maps of ringed topoi. For example, given a composition of ringed topoi
$$X \xrightarrow{f} Y \to S$$
and an $S$-extension $j:Y \to Y'$ of $Y$ by an $\mathcal{O}_Y$-module $J$, there is an obstruction class
$$\omega(f,j) \in \text{Ext}^2(\mathbf{L}_{X/Y}, f^*J)$$
which can be described as the yoneda product
$$\omega(f,j) = f^*(e(j))\cdot K(X/Y/S)$$
where
$$\begin{align}
K(X/Y/S) &\in \text{Ext}^1(\mathbf{L}_{X/Y}, \mathbf{L}_{Y/S}) \\
f^*(e(j)) &\in \text{Ext}^1(f^*\mathbf{L}_{Y/S}, f^*J)
\end{align}$$
and $\mathbf{L}_{X/Y}$ corresponds to the cotangent complex.

== See also ==
- Ext functor
- Derived category
- Deformation theory
- Kodaira–Spencer map
