= Root directory =

First or top-most directory in a hierarchy

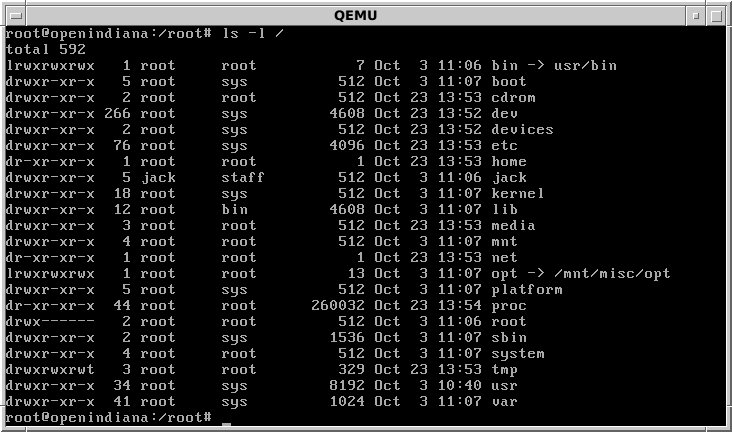
View of the root directory in the OpenIndiana operating system

In a computer file system, and primarily used in the Unix and Unix-like operating systems, the root directory is the first or top-most directory in a hierarchy. It can be likened to the trunk of a tree, as the starting point where all branches originate from. The root file system is the file system contained on the same disk partition on which the root directory is located; it is the filesystem on top of which all other file systems are mounted as the system boots up.

== Unix-like systems ==
Unix abstracts the nature of this tree hierarchy entirely and in Unix and Unix-like systems the root directory is denoted by the / (slash) sign. Though the root directory is conventionally referred to as /, the directory entry itself has no name – its path is the "empty" part before the initial directory separator character (/). All file system entries, including mounted file systems are "branches" of this root.

=== chroot ===
In UNIX-like operating systems, each process has its own idea of what the root directory is. For most processes this is the same as the system's actual root directory, but it can be changed by calling the chroot system call. This is typically done to create a secluded environment to run software that requires legacy libraries and sometimes to simplify software installation and debugging. Chroot is not meant to be used for enhanced security as the processes inside can break out.

=== Super-root ===
Some Unix systems support a directory below the root directory. Normally, "/.." points back to the same inode as "/", however, under MUNIX, this can be changed to point to a super-root directory, where remote trees can be mounted. If, for example, two workstations "pcs2a" and "pcs2b" were connected via "connectnodes" and "uunite" startup script, "/../pcs2b" could be used to access the root directory of "pcs2b" from "pcs2a".

== DOS/Windows systems ==
Under DOS, OS/2, and Microsoft Windows, each partition has a drive letter assignment (e.g. the C partition is labeled C:\) and there is no public root directory on it.

== Related uses ==
On many Unixes, there is also a directory named /root (pronounced "slash root" ). This is the home directory of the 'root' superuser. On many Mac and iOS systems this superuser home directory is /var/root.

The root directory of a website corresponds to its domain name, the home page's URL.

== See also ==
- Filesystem Hierarchy Standard (FHS)
- Parent directory
- Working directory
