= Interactive ALGOL 68 =

Programming language dialect

- Paradigms: structured, imperative
- Family: ALGOL
- Designed by: Peter Craven
- Developer: Algol Applications, Oxford and Cambridge Compilers Ltd (OCCL)
- First appeared: 1984; 42 years ago
- Final release: Final / 2004; 22 years ago
- Typing discipline: static, strong, safe, structural
- Scope: lexical
- Platform: Intel x86, Inmos Transputer: SPARC
- OS: Linux, SunOS-4.1.3 (Solaris 1); Windows 95, NT; OS/2
- License: proprietary

Influenced by
- ALGOL 68

The Interactive ALGOL 68 is a structured, imperative high-level computer programming language, a dialect of, and compiler for, ALGOL 68. It was made available by Peter Craven of Algol Applications in 1984, then in 1994 from OCCL (Oxford and Cambridge Compilers Ltd) until 2004.

== Platforms ==
- Inmos Transputer family
- Linux for Intel x86 computers
- OS/2 version 2.0 and after
- SunOS-4.1.3 (Solaris 1) for SPARC-based computers
- Microsoft Windows 95 and Windows NT for Intel

== Extensions to standard ALGOL 68 ==
1. Ability to include source code, and versions of source code.
2. Nestable comments
3. FORALL syntactic element for looping over arrays.
4. ANYMODE a union of all MODEs known to the compiler, and hence dynamic typing.
5. Enhanced coercions (casting) allowing stringer then "strong" coercions.
6. Enstructuring automatically coerces a variable from type to struct(type)
7. Conforming coerces UNION (THING, MOODS) to THING, but if that is not the current mood of the union, then a run-time error will be generated.
8. Library interface to the native operating system and other libraries.
9. The operator SIZE
10. Pseudo-operators ANDTH and OREL, and ANF and ORF for Short-circuit evaluation of Boolean expressions.
11. Arrays can be slices with stride to select a subset of elements.
12. MOID is treated differently.

=== Example of code ===
MODULE vectors
BEGIN
    INT dim=3;
    MODE VECTOR = [dim]REAL;
    OP + = (VECTOR a, b) VECTOR: ( VECTOR out; FOR i FROM LWB a TO UPB a DO out:=a[i]+b[i] OD; out ),
       - = (VECTOR a, b) VECTOR: ( VECTOR out; FOR i FROM LWB a TO UPB a DO out:=a[i]-b[i] OD; out ),
       DOT = (VECTOR a, b) REAL: ( REAL out:=0; FOR i FROM LWB a TO UPB a DO out+:=a[i]*b[i] OD; out );
END
KEEP VECTOR, +, -, DOT

== Restrictions to the language from the standard ALGOL 68 ==
1. Variable, Modes and Operators must be declared before use.
2. Anonymous procedure may use rows-declarer as a parameter.
3. No transient subnames of flexible arrays.
4. No formatted Transput (or format-texts).
5. Restricted use of straightening of multiple values during Transput.
6. Limited use of BYTES, BITS and BOOL.
7. restricted use of labels to follow EXIT statements.
