= Russoft =

Russian association of software companies

- Руссофт
- Formation: September 9, 1999; 27 years ago
- Purpose: Public relations, networking
- Headquarters: Saint-Petersburg, Russia
- Fields: Technology and software
- Leader: Valentin Makarov
- Website: www.russoft.org

Russoft is a Saint-Petersburg-based industry association of software companies from Russia. It was founded on September 9, 1999 with 10 member companies and merged with the Fort-Ross Consortium in May 2004. Oreanda News listed the organization's member count as 263 companies in March 2023 and Russoft claimed 334 in February 2024. They publish annual reports on the Russian technology sector.

== Overview ==
Russoft members pay fees depending on their size and can be either a full or associate member. The organization is part of the Russian Information and Computer Industry Association (APKIT), where it sits on the Software Development and Export Committee. It is also a member of the Central and Eastern European Outsourcing Association. Fort-Ross began hosting the Russian Outsourcing and Software Summit in June 2001 and continues to hold it annually under the Russoft name.

Similarly to Indian NASSCOM, Russoft was created to represent Russian software development companies on the global market, to enhance marketing and PR activities of its members, and to lobby their interests to the government. In 2018, Russoft and NASSCOM established a formal partnership. Since the Russian invasion of Ukraine in 2022, many Russian companies have started exploring other avenues to survive amid sanctions from Western countries, their main export market. Some have already started joint ventures with Indian companies. In 2023, Russoft asked the Ministry of Finance for 465 million rubles a year to start an accelerator to support Russian IT companies with launching new products.
