= Michel Sintzoff =

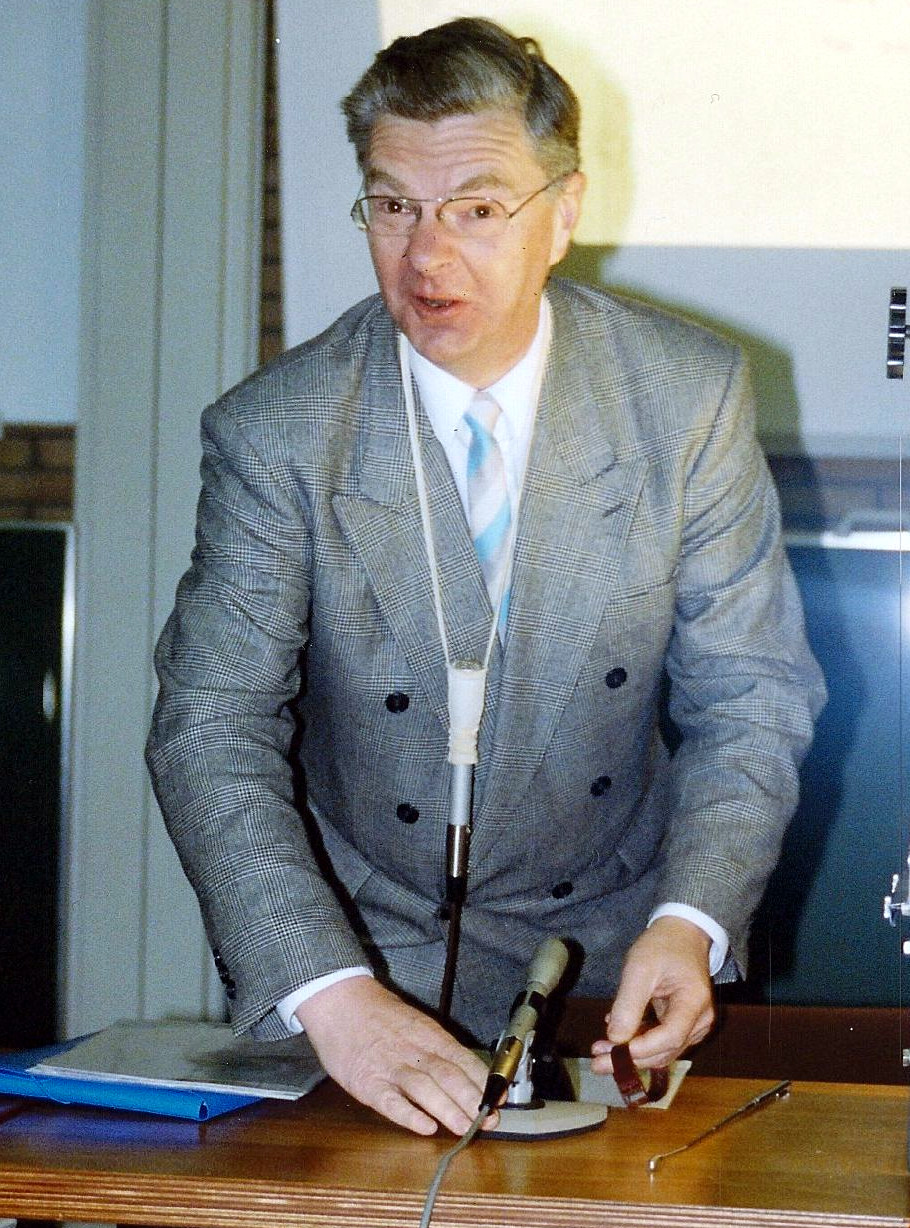
- Sintzoff at a symposium at the CWI, Amsterdam, 1991
- Born: 12 August 1938; Brussels, Belgium
- Died: 28 November 2010 (aged 72); Belgium
- Citizenship: Belgium
- Education: Université catholique de Louvain (M.Sc., 1962)
- Known for: ALGOL 68; Science of Computer Programming
- Scientific career
- Fields: Mathematics, computer science
- Institutions: Manufacture Belge de Lampes et matériel Electrique Research Laboratory; Université catholique de Louvain

Michel Sintzoff (12 August 1938 – 28 November 2010) was a Belgian mathematician and computer scientist.

He was one of the editors of the Revised Report on the Algorithmic Language Algol 68.

He was a member of the International Federation for Information Processing (IFIP) IFIP Working Group 2.1 on Algorithmic Languages and Calculi, which specified, maintains, and supports the programming languages ALGOL 60 and ALGOL 68.

He was also a member of IFIP Working Group 2.3 on Programming Methodology, of which he was chairperson from 2003 to 2006.

In 1981, he founded the journal Science of Computer Programming. Until 1999, he was editor-in-chief.

In 1993, he was elected a member of the Academia Europaea.
