= ALGOL Y =

ALGOL Y was the name given to a speculated successor for the ALGOL 60 programming language that incorporated some radical features that were rejected for ALGOL 68 and ALGOL X. ALGOL Y was intended to be a "radical reconstruction" of ALGOL.

One such feature was the possibility to construct new proc mode's at run-time, which was criticized as the "ability to modify its own programs at run time" while, on the other hand, it would have brought ALGOL Y to the same level of expressiveness as LISP.

"Initially the proposal for an update to Algol was Algol X, with Algol Y being the name reserved for the corresponding metalanguage. Van Wijngaarden produced a paper for the 1963 IFIP programming language committee, entitled “Generalized Algol,” which contained the basic concepts which were eventually incorporated into Algol 68."

== See also ==
- ALGOL 60
- ALGOL 68
