= Nobuo Yoneda =

Japanese mathematician and computer scientist

- 米田 信夫
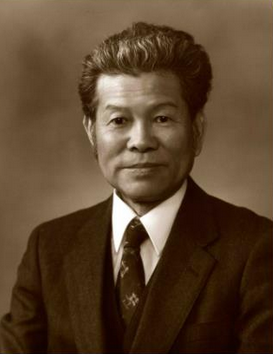
- Nobuo Yoneda
- Born: 28 March 1930; Japan
- Died: 22 April 1996 (aged 66)
- Citizenship: Japan
- Education: University of Tokyo (DSc, 1961)
- Known for: Yoneda lemma Yoneda product ALGOL
- Scientific career
- Fields: Mathematics; Computer science
- Institutions: University of Tokyo; Gakushuin University; Tokyo Denki University
- Thesis: On ext and exact sequences (1961)
- Doctoral advisor: Shokichi Iyanaga

Nobuo Yoneda (米田 信夫, Yoneda Nobuo; 28 March 1930 – 22 April 1996) was a Japanese mathematician and computer scientist.

In 1952, he graduated the Department of Mathematics, the Faculty of Science, the University of Tokyo, and obtained his Bachelor of Science. That same year, he was appointed Assistant Professor in the Department of Mathematics of the University of Tokyo. He obtained his Doctor of Science (DSc) degree from the University of Tokyo in 1961, under the direction of Shokichi Iyanaga. In 1962, he was appointed Associate Professor in the Faculty of Science at Gakushuin University, and was promoted in 1966 to the rank of Professor. He became a professor of Theoretical Foundation of Information Science in 1972. After retiring from the University of Tokyo in 1990, he moved to Tokyo Denki University.

The Yoneda lemma in category theory and the Yoneda product in homological algebra are named after him.

In computer science, he is known for his work on dialects of the programming language ALGOL. He became involved with developing international standards in programming and informatics, as a Japanese representative on the International Federation for Information Processing (IFIP) IFIP Working Group 2.1 on Algorithmic Languages and Calculi, which specified, supports, and maintains the languages ALGOL 60 and ALGOL 68.
