= Adriaan van Wijngaarden =

Dutch mathematician and computer scientist

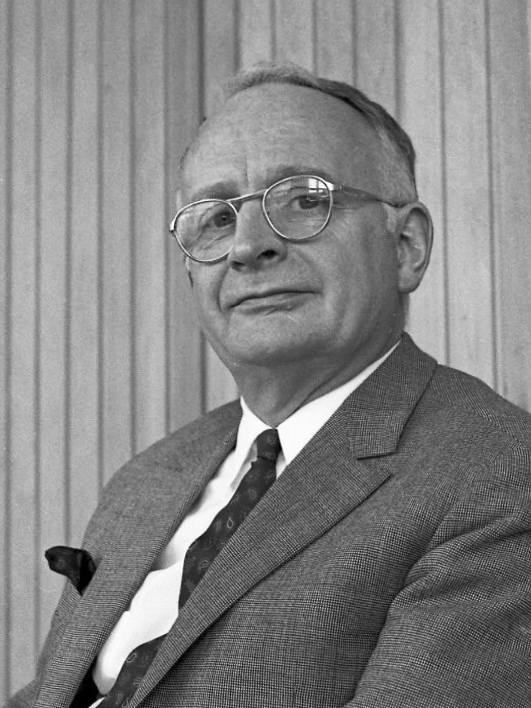
- Born: 2 November 1916; Rotterdam, Netherlands
- Died: 7 February 1987 (aged 70); Amstelveen, Netherlands
- Citizenship: Netherlands
- Education: Delft University of Technology (1939)
- Known for: ALGOL; CWI; IFIP; Van Wijngaarden grammar
- Awards: IEEE Computer Pioneer Award (1986)
- Scientific career
- Fields: Numerical mathematics Computer science
- Workplaces: University of Amsterdam; Mathematisch Centrum in Amsterdam
- Doctoral advisor: Cornelis Benjamin Biezeno
- Doctoral students: Edsger W. Dijkstra; Peter van Emde Boas; Jaco de Bakker; Reinder van de Riet; Guus Zoutendijk; Maarten van Emden

Signature
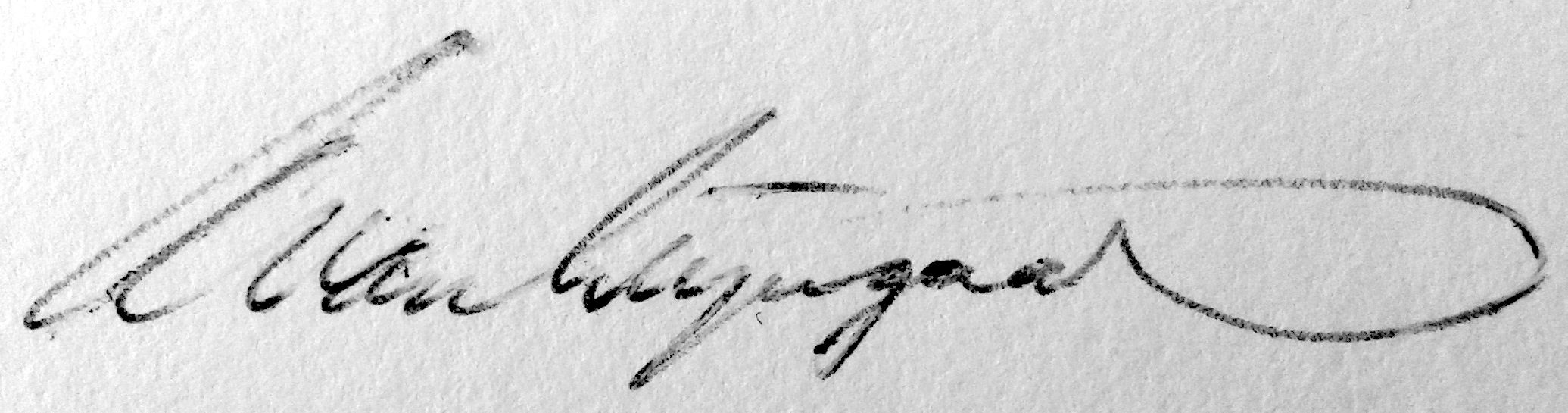

Adriaan "Aad" van Wijngaarden (2 November 1916 – 7 February 1987) was a Dutch mathematician and computer scientist. Trained as a mechanical engineer, Van Wijngaarden emphasized and promoted the mathematical aspects of computing, first in numerical analysis, then in programming languages and finally in design principles of such languages.

== Biography ==
Van Wijngaarden's university education was in mechanical engineering, for which he received a degree from Delft University of Technology in 1939. He then studied for a doctorate in hydrodynamics, but abandoned the field. He joined the Nationaal Luchtvaartlaboratorium in 1945 and went with a group to England the next year to learn about new technologies that had been developed there during World War II.

Van Wijngaarden was intrigued by the new idea of automatic computing. On 1 January 1947, he became the head of the Computing Department of the brand-new Centrum Wiskunde & Informatica (CWI), which was at the time known as the Mathematisch Centrum (MC), in Amsterdam. He then made further visits to England and the United States, gathering ideas for the construction of the first Dutch computer, the ARRA, an electromechanical device first demonstrated in 1952. In that same year, Van Wijngaarden hired Edsger W. Dijkstra, and they worked on software for the ARRA.

in 1958, while visiting Edinburgh, Scotland, Van Wijngaarden was seriously injured in an automobile accident in which his wife was killed. After he recovered, he focused more on programming language research. The following year, he became a member of the Royal Netherlands Academy of Arts and Sciences.

In 1961, he became the director of the Mathematisch Centrum in Amsterdam and remained in that post for the next twenty years.

He was one of the designers of the original ALGOL language, and later ALGOL 68, for which he developed a two-level type of formal grammar that became known as a Van Wijngaarden grammar.

In 1962, he became involved with developing international standards in programming and informatics, as a member of the International Federation for Information Processing (IFIP) IFIP Working Group 2.1 on Algorithmic Languages and Calculi, which specified, maintains, and supports the programming languages ALGOL 60 and ALGOL 68.

== Van Wijngaarden Awards ==
The Van Wijngaarden Awards are named in his honor and are awarded every 5 years from the 60th anniversary of the Centrum Wiskunde & Informatica in 2006. The physical award consists of a bronze sculpture.

- 2006: Computer scientist Nancy Lynch and mathematician-magician Persi Diaconis.
- 2011: Computer scientist Éva Tardos and numerical mathematician John C. Butcher.
- 2016: Computer scientist Xavier Leroy and statistician Sara van de Geer.
- 2021: Computer scientist Marta Kwiatkowska and statistician Susan Murphy.

== See also ==
- List of pioneers in computer science
- List of computer science awards
