= Butt Report =

British war report

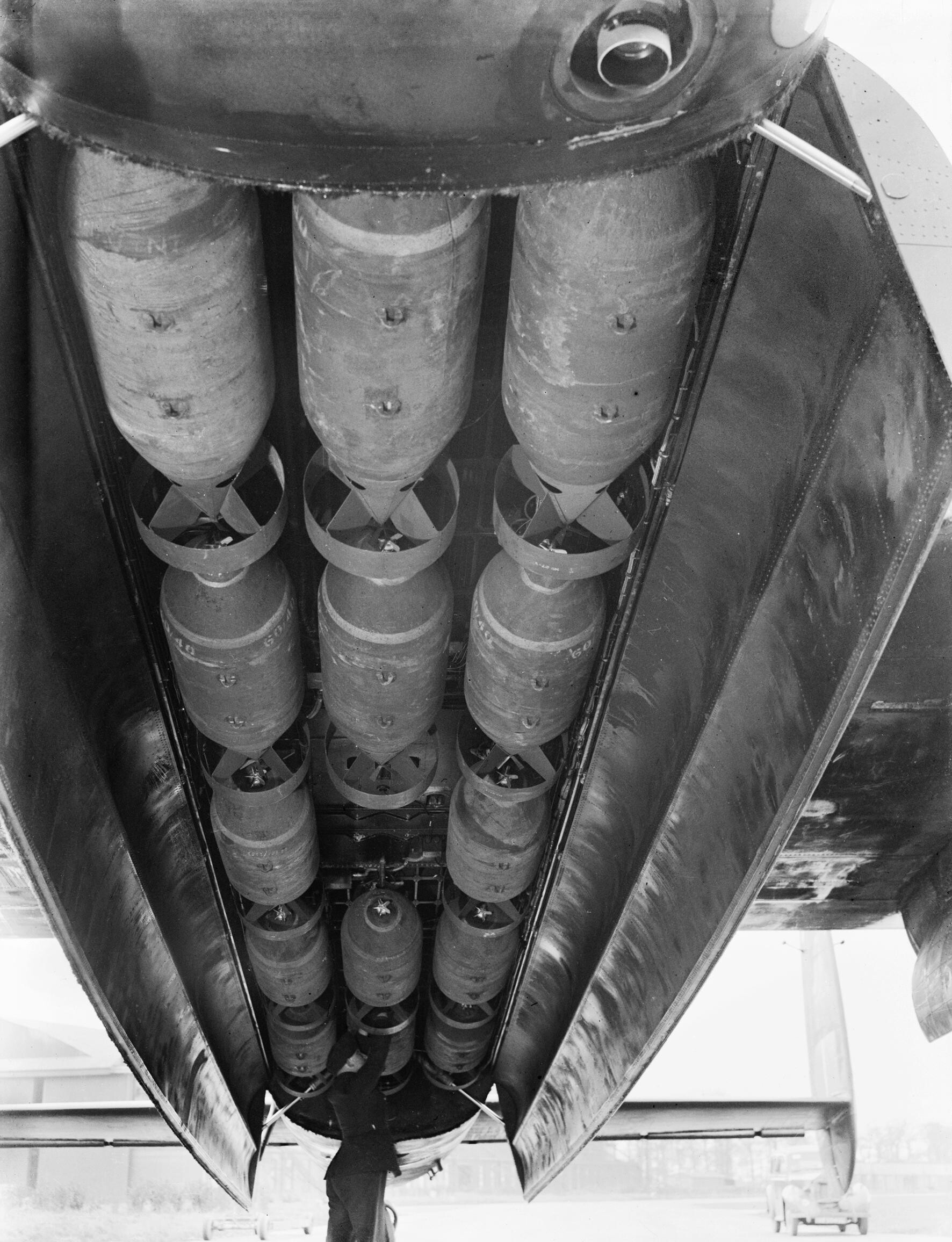
The bomb-bay of an Avro Lancaster; the aircraft's downward pointing camera can be seen in front of it.

The Butt Report, released on 18 August 1941, was a report prepared during World War II, revealing the widespread failure of RAF Bomber Command aircraft to hit their targets.

At the start of the war, Bomber Command had no real means of determining the success of its operations. Crews would return with only their word as to the amount of damage caused or even if they had bombed the target. The Air Ministry demanded that a method of verifying these claims be developed and by 1941 cameras mounted under bombers, triggered by the bomb release, were being fitted.

== Contents ==
The report was initiated by Lord Cherwell, a friend of Churchill and chief scientific advisor to the Cabinet. David Bensusan-Butt, a civil servant in the War Cabinet Secretariat and an assistant of Cherwell, was given the task of assessing 633 target photos and comparing them with crews' claims. The results, first circulated on 18 August 1941, were a shock to many, though not necessarily to those within the RAF, who knew the difficulty of night navigation and target finding.

Any examination of night photographs taken during night bombing in June and July points to the following conclusions:

1. Of those aircraft recorded as attacking their target, only one in three struck within 5 mi (8.0 km).
2. Over the French ports, the proportion was two in three; over Germany as a whole, the proportion was one in four; over the Ruhr it was only one in ten.
3. In the full moon, the proportion was two in five; in the new moon it was only one in fifteen. ...
4. All these figures relate only to aircraft recorded as attacking the target; the proportion of the total sorties which reached within 5 miles is less than one-third. ...

The conclusion seems to follow that only about one-third of aircraft claiming to reach their target actually reached it.

Postwar studies confirmed Butt's assessment, showing that 49% of Bomber Command bombs dropped between May 1940 and May 1941 fell in open country. As Butt did not include those aircraft that did not bomb because of equipment failure, enemy action, weather or which failed to find the target, only about 5% of bombers setting out bombed within 5 mi (8.0 km) of the target.

== Contemporary debate, dehousing and Singleton Report ==
The truth about the failure of Bomber Command shook everyone. Senior RAF commanders argued that the Butt report's statistics were faulty and commissioned another report, which was delivered by the Directorate of Bombing Operations on 22 September 1941; extrapolating from an analysis of the bomb damage inflicted on British cities, it calculated that the RAF could destroy the forty-three German towns with a population of more than 100,000 using a force of 4,000 bombers. The Chief of the Air Staff, Sir Charles Portal, argued that with such a force Bomber Command could win the war in six months. Not all were convinced and when Churchill expressed his doubts, the Air Staff retrenched and said that even if it did not knock Germany out of the war, it would weaken them sufficiently to allow British armed forces back into Europe. With this compromise between the armed services, Bomber Command was allowed to keep its planned allocation of materiel. This did not stop those outside the Chiefs of Staff questioning the strategic bombing policy.

A particularly damning speech had been delivered on 24 February 1942 in the House of Commons by one of the Members of Parliament for the University of Cambridge constituency, Professor A. V. Hill—the noted research scientist and previously a member of the committee that had sponsored research into radar. His speech pointed out that

The total [British] casualties in air-raids – in killed – since the beginning of the war are only two-thirds of those we lost as prisoners of war at Singapore.... The loss of production in the worst month of the Blitz was about equal to that due to the Easter holidays.... The Air Ministry have been ... too optimistic.... We know most of the bombs we drop hit nothing of importance. ...

In response to the concerns raised by the Butt report, Cherwell produced his dehousing paper (first circulated on 30 March 1942), which proposed that by area bombing instead of futile attempts at precision bombing the deficiencies of the RAF could be mitigated. The Secretary of State for Air, Sir Archibald Sinclair and Sir Charles Portal were delighted by the paper as it offered support to them in their battle to save the strategic bomber offensive, which had been under attack from others in the high command who thought that the resources put into Bomber Command were damaging the other branches of the armed services, with little to show for it.

On reading the dehousing paper, Professor Patrick Blackett, the chief scientist to the Royal Navy, said that the paper's estimate of what could be achieved was 600 percent too high. The principal advocate for the reduction of Bomber Command in favour of other options was Sir Henry Tizard. He argued that the only benefit to strategic bombing was that it tied up enemy resources defending Germany but that those forces could be tied up with a far smaller bombing offensive. He wrote to Cherwell on 15 April querying the figures in the paper and warning that the War Cabinet could reach the wrong decision if they based their decision on it. His criticism of the paper was that experience suggested that only 7,000 bombers would be delivered rather than the 10,000 in the paper, and since only 25 percent of the bombs were likely to land on target the total dropped would be no more than 50,000, so the strategy would not work with the resources available.

Mr. Justice Singleton, a High Court Judge, was asked by the Cabinet to look into the competing points of view. In his report delivered on 20 May 1942, he concluded that

If Russia can hold Germany on land I doubt whether Germany will stand 12 or 18 months' continuous, intensified and increased bombing, affecting, as it must, her war production, her power of resistance, her industries and her will to resist (by which I mean morale).

In the end, thanks in part to the dehousing paper, it was this view which prevailed but C. P. Snow (later Lord Snow) wrote that the debate became quite vitriolic with Tizard being called a defeatist. It was while this debate about bombing was raging inside the British military establishment that the area bombing directive of 14 February 1942 was issued; eight days later Arthur "Bomber" Harris took up the post of Air Officer Commanding-in-Chief (AOC-in-C) of Bomber Command.

== Aftermath ==
As the war progressed, RAF Bomber Command improved its methods. Electronic navigational instruments like GEE, Oboe, G-H and the ground-mapping radar codenamed H2S all helped to improve bombing accuracy. Improvement in tactics such as the development of the Pathfinder Force, created against Harris's wishes, also improved bombing accuracy. By 1945, No. 5 Group RAF could sector-bomb in a fan-shaped pattern that maximised the coverage and effect of incendiary bombs. To create this effect, the run of a bomber was timed and calculated to fan out from a bomb aiming point, as was done in the bombing of Dresden in February 1945, when the aiming point was the Ostragehege soccer stadium, easily identifiable with H2S.
