= E. H. Putley =

British scientist and author (1922–2009)

Ernest Henry Putley (1922 – 29 November 2009) was a British scientist and prolific author. He is best known for his work on radar, the Hall Effect, and infra-red spectroscopy.

Putley was born in South London and graduated with a BSc in physics from Queen Mary College in 1942. In August 1942 he started work at the Telecommunications Research Establishment (TRE) in Malvern, which was later known as RSRE, DERA, and more recently Dstl & QinetiQ. After the war he returned briefly to Queen Mary College to complete his PhD.

Putley retired from RSRE in 1982 but returned almost immediately as an unpaid volunteer to record the history of the military electronic developments with which he had been involved for so long.

== Select bibliography ==
- Putley, E H; Arthur, J B (1951). "Lead Sulphide – An Intrinsic Semiconductor". Proceedings of the Physical Society. Series B. 64 (7): 616. doi:10.1088/0370-1301/64/7/110.
- E.H. Putley; W.H. Mitchel (18 April 1958). "The Electrical Conductivity and Hall Effect of Silicon" (PDF). pp. 193–200. Archived from the original (PDF) on 1 July 2016.
- W. D. Lawson; S. Nielson; E. H. Putley; A. S. Young (1959). "Preparation and properties of HgTe and mixed crystals of HgTe-CdTe". J. Phys. Chem. Solids. 9 (3–4): 325–329. Bibcode:1959JPCS....9..325L. doi:10.1016/0022-3697(59)90110-6.
- E. H. Putley (1960). The Hall Effect and Related Phenomena. Butterworth.
- E. H. Putley (1968). The Hall Effect and Semi-conductor Physics.
- E. H. Putley (1985). "The history of the RSRE". Physics in Technology. 16 (1): 13. Bibcode:1985rsre.nasa..165P. doi:10.1088/0305-4624/16/1/401.
- E. H. Putley (1985). "Historical radar" (PDF). IEE Proceedings A - Physical Science, Measurement and Instrumentation, Management and Education, Reviews. 132 (6): 325–326. doi:10.1049/ip-a-1.1985.0068.
- E. H. Putley (1997). "The birth of the chip". Electrotechnology. 8 (2): 26–27. OCLC 198283357.
- "Dr E.H. Putley on A.P. Rowe", pp. 31–33 in Latham, Colin & Stobbs, Anne (1999) "Pioneers of Radar", Sutton ISBN 0-7509-2120-X
- Putley, Ernest (2009) "Science comes to Malvern - TRE a Story of Radar 1942-1953", Aspect Design, Malvern

Lists

- OCLC WorldCat - lists over 100 of Putley's works
- Google books
- Private Papers of Dr E H Putley, Imperial War Museum
