= Gee-H (navigation) =

Radio navigation system developed by Britain during World War II

Gee-H, sometimes written G-H or GEE-H, was a radio navigation system developed by Britain during the Second World War to aid RAF Bomber Command. The name refers to the system's use of the earlier Gee equipment, as well as its use of the "H principle" or "twin-range principle" of location determination. Its official name was AMES Type 100.

Gee-H was used to supplant the Oboe bombing system which worked along similar lines. By measuring and keeping a fixed distance to a radio station, the bomber could navigate along an arc in the sky. The bombs were dropped when they reached a set distance from a second station. The main difference between Oboe and Gee-H was the location of the equipment; Oboe used large displays in ground stations to take very accurate measurements but could only direct one aircraft at a time. Gee-H used much smaller systems on aircraft and while somewhat less accurate, could direct as many as eighty aircraft at a time.

Gee-H entered service in October 1943 and first used successfully in November against the Mannesmann steel works at Düsseldorf on the night of 1/2 November, when about half of the sets failed leaving only 15 aircraft to bomb the factory. Gee-H remained in use throughout the war, although it was subject to considerable jamming from the Germans. It also remained a standard fixture of post-war RAF aircraft like the English Electric Canberra. Gee-H was adapted by RCA into the US wartime SHORAN system with improved accuracy. The same basic concept remains in widespread use today as the civilian DME system.

== Development history ==
=== Distance measuring navigation ===
Determining your location in 2D space requires two measurements of angle or range - two angle measurements, two distance measurements, or one angle and one distance. Early radio navigation was typically based on taking two angle measurements using radio direction finders, but these were accurate only to a few degrees and only provided accuracy on the order of tens of miles. The development of range-based systems had to wait until the invention of accurate time measurement of radio signals were possible, which came about as a result of the development of radar.

The Luftwaffe pioneered the use of distance-measuring radio navigation systems with their Y-Gerät system in 1941. Y-Gerät used a Knickebein-like beam for steering the bomber in the proper direction and an onboard transponder for distance measurements. A special signal was periodically sent from a ground station, and on reception, the transponder would send out an answering pulse after a known delay. A ground operator used an oscilloscope to measure the time between broadcast and reception and deduced the range in a fashion similar to conventional radar systems. He then radioed this information to the bomber by voice, telling them when to release their bombs.

A failing of the beam-type system of navigation is that the beams cannot be focused perfectly and in practice are fan-shaped, growing wider with distance from the broadcaster, accuracy falling with range. Measurements of distance are dependent only on the accuracy of the equipment, and are independent of range. This means their accuracy is a fixed percentage of the measurement, and so is linear with range. It is possible to use two measurements to provide a location fix, but such systems are generally difficult to use, as they require two range measurements to be made in quick succession, while the aircraft is moving.

=== Oboe ===
The Air Ministry developed a distance-measuring system known as Oboe which first started reaching the Pathfinder Force in late 1941 and was used experimentally in 1942. Oboe avoided the problems with two distance measurements by using only one at a time. Before the mission, the distance from one of the Oboe stations to the target was measured and an arc of that radius drawn on a conventional navigation chart. For instance, for an attack on a target in Düsseldorf, the distance between the Oboe station near Walmer and the target would be about 235 mi (378 km); an arc with a 235 mi (378 km) radius around the station would be drawn, passing through Düsseldorf. Now the "range" of the bombs being dropped would be calculated, the distance between the point where the bombs are released and the point that they hit. For missions around 20,000 ft (6,100 m) in height, range is typically on the order of 1.5 mi (2.4 km) for a high-speed aircraft like the de Havilland Mosquito. The planners would calculate the place along the arc where the bombs would need to be dropped to hit the target. This calculation, carried out on the ground, could be as time-consuming as required, allowing for the consideration of winds, atmospheric pressure, even the tiny centrifugal force generated by the aircraft following the 235 mi (378 km) radius curve.

During the sortie, the bomber crew would fly to one end of the arc using any means of navigation including dead reckoning. When they were near the location, the transponder was switched on and the Oboe station would measure their distance. This "cat" station would then send out a voice-frequency radio signal of either dots or dashes, allowing the pilot to adjust the path to be at the right distance, where the transmission would be a steady tone, the "equisignal". Operators would watch the position of the aircraft, sending out correcting signals as needed so the pilot could adjust the path along the arc.

A second station would also measure the distance to the bomber. This station was equipped with the bomb's range value calculated earlier and had used this to calculate the distance between their station and the bomber at the point where the bombs should be dropped. When this mouse station saw the bomber approaching the drop point, it sent Morse code signals to inform the pilot that the drop point was approaching. At the right moment, it would send another morse signal that would drop the bombs automatically.

The main constraint with Oboe was that it could only be used by one aircraft at a time. As it took about ten minutes for the bomber to get onto the arc, this delay meant that the system could not be used for a large raid with aircraft in succession. Oboe was used to guide the target marking aircraft of the pathfinder force, giving the Main Force bombers an accurate aiming point in any weather. Oboe was sometimes used for attacks on precision targets by one or a small number of aircraft dropping one after the other. In tests, Oboe demonstrated accuracies greater than those of optical bombsights during daylight in good weather.

=== A new approach ===
Oboe was limited to one aircraft because the onboard transponder would send pulses every time the ground stations queried them. If more than one aircraft turned on their transponder, the ground stations would start to receive several return pulses for every query, with no way to distinguish between them. One solution to this problem is to have each Oboe station send out a slightly different signal, normally by changing the envelope of the signal it broadcasts to the aircraft. Similar stations with different signal modifications can be situated around the UK, so that all of them are visible to an aircraft over Germany. An aircraft that turns on its transponder will receive and re-transmit signals from all of them. Although all of the ground stations will receive all of the signals, they can pick out their own by looking for their unique signal. This change allows many Oboe stations to be operational at the same time, although it does not help the situation if more than one aircraft turns on their transponder. Swapping the transmitters and receivers, so that the receiver is on the aircraft and the transmitter on the ground means that each aircraft generates a different signal pattern, and the operators on the aircraft can look for their own signal and ignore the others. Any number of aircraft can use the same station at the same time. As long as the ground station is equipped to quickly turn the signals around and the aircraft do not query too often, the chance of more than one aircraft querying the station at the very same time is low. This is the basic concept behind Gee-H.

=== Gee-H ===
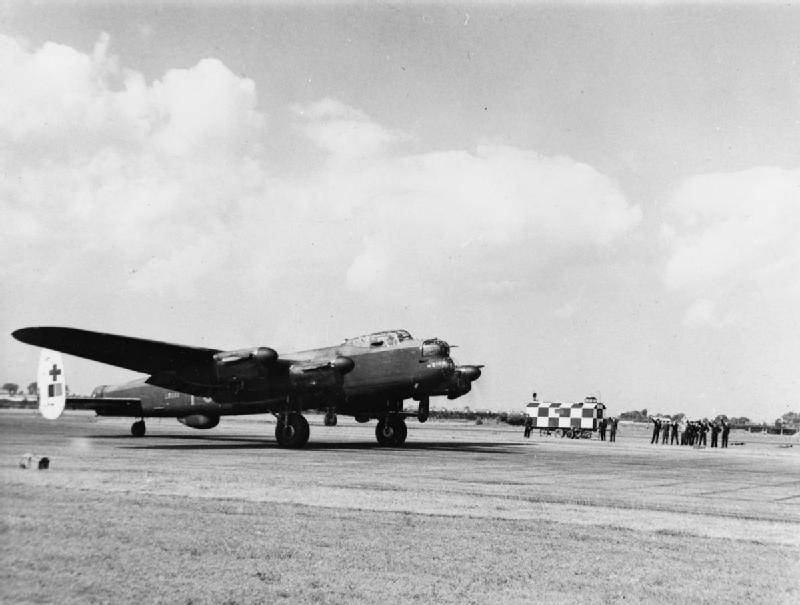
G–H Leader Avro Lancaster B Mark III of 467 Squadron RAAF as it begins its take-off run at RAF Waddington, August 1944

The first radio navigation system to be operated by Bomber Command was Gee. This operated by sending out two pulses of known timing from ground stations which were picked up by the aircraft and read on an oscilloscope. The timing between transmissions was not fixed and varied from station to station, so the equipment in the bomber had a system that allowed it to adjust for this. The receiver had a local oscillator that provided a time base generator that could be adjusted. When the receiver was first turned on, the pulses from the ground station would move across the display because the two time bases were not synchronized. The operator then tuned their oscillator until the pulses stopped moving, which meant that the local oscillator was now at precisely the same pulse frequency as that in the ground station. The receiver had two systems of this type, allowing the operator to receive signals from two stations and easily compare them and make simultaneous measurements.

Rapidly to deploy the new design, it was decided to use as much of the Gee equipment as possible. Gee already included the oscilloscope display and the receiver unit, so all that was needed was a broadcaster unit that would trigger the ground station transceiver. This was designed to operate on the same frequencies as Gee, so that the existing receiver and display equipment in the bombers could be used. The new transmitter sent out pulses about 100 times a second. The timing of the pulses was slightly advanced or retarded from 100 per second. This meant that every aircraft had a slightly different timing. The same signal was also sent to the Gee display unit to start the display beam moving across the face of the display, instead of using Gee's manually tuned oscillator. This way, the received signals that did not have the same inter-pulse timing would appear to move one way or the other, like a mistuned Gee. Only the signals originating from the aircraft's own transmitter would line up on the display and remain motionless. This deliberate adjustment of the timing was known as "jittering".

The delay from the original Gee was still used; the navigator would first set the delay of the upper trace on the Gee display to a known figure that matched the radius of the arc they wanted to fly along. This would move the "blip" from the local transmitter along the face of the display. Received signals would then be inverted and sent to the display. The navigator could then direct the pilot onto the right path by giving directions until the upper and lower blips aligned. The same was done for the second channel, setting it to the computed range where the bombs should be dropped. Since they stayed the same distance from one station the operator only had to check that periodically, while watching the ever-moving lower trace as the active blip moved slowly along the display towards the timer blip until they overlapped and the bombs were dropped.

The time taken by the transceiver to receive a pulse, send out the response and return to the receiving condition was about 100 microseconds. With a pulse timing of about 100 a second, a transceiver would be busy for 10 ms out of every second responding to the signals from any one aircraft. This would leave 990 ms free to respond to other aircraft, giving a theoretical capacity of 100 aircraft. In practice, due to the "jitter", about 70 to 80 aircraft could use a station at a time.

The system had the additional advantage that each aircraft selected its timing, which made jamming harder. With most pulsed navigation systems like Gee and Y-Gerät, it is relatively easy to jam the system simply by sending out additional pulses on the same frequency, cluttering up the display and making it very difficult for the operator to read the signal. The British had used this technique to great effect against Y-Gerät, and the Germans returned the favour against Gee. By the late war period, Gee was generally useless for bombing and used primarily as a navigational aid when returning to England.

In the case of Gee-H, each aircraft had unique timing; to jam the receiver, the jammer would also have to have similar timing. As one signal might be used by dozens of aircraft, dozens of jammers set to slightly different times would be needed. As there were dozens of transceivers as well, many unused decoy signals, the magnitude of the jamming problem was considerably worse. As the Gee-H system used Gee equipment, turning off the interrogation transmitter turned it back into a normal Gee unit. On a typical mission, the set would be used for Gee while leaving England and forming up into a bomber stream, for Gee-H during the mission and back to Gee on the return flight for finding its airbase. Since Gee could be directly read on a map, it was extremely useful for general navigation, while Gee-H was only practically used to navigate to one place.

Gee-H's main fault was caused by using Gee equipment; using a higher frequency would allow a tighter envelope, which would allow more accurate timing measurements and thus improve accuracy. Because the system used Gee's small oscilloscope for measurements, it did not have the same visual accuracy as Oboe, which used 12-inch oscilloscopes developed specifically for this purpose. Gee-H achieved accuracy of about 150 yd (140 m) at 300 mi (480 km), while Oboe was good to about 50 yd (46 m). As with all VHF and UHF-based systems, Gee-H was limited to distances just out of line of sight, in this case limiting it to about 300 mi (480 km).

Gee-H was used in Operation Glimmer, a diversionary "attack" during Operation Overlord that diverted German defences at Calais while the real invasion fleet was 200 mi (320 km) away at Normandy. Gee-H-equipped bombers of 218 Squadron flew low, in tight circles, dropping Window (chaff) over radar transponder-equipped small ships, to deceive the German radars that they were the main invasion fleet.

== Air Ministry designations ==
- Gee-H Mk. I - Airborne Radio Installation (ARI) 5525
- Gee-H Mk. II - ARI 5597
- Gee-H Mk. II (Tropicalised) - ARI 5696

== See also ==
- Battle of the Beams
- Lorenz beam
- Oboe (navigation)
- List of World War II electronic warfare equipment
