= Albert Rowe (physicist) =

British physicist (1898–1976)

Albert Rowe CBE
- Pre-Second World War photograoh

11th Vice-chancellor of the University of Adelaide
- In office 1948–1958
- Chancellor: Sir Mellis Napier
- Preceded by: John McKellar Stewart
- Succeeded by: Sir Henry Bolton Basten

Chief Superintendent of RAF Bawdsey / the Telecommunications Research Establishment
- In office 25 May 1938 – October 1945

Personal details
- Born: 23 March 1898 Launceston, Cornwall
- Died: 25 May 1976 (aged 78) Linton, Herefordshire
- Spouse: Mary Gordon Mathews (m. 1932)
- Education: University College London (BSc., 1926); University of Adelaide (DSc., 1961)
- Occupation: Defence scientist, academic, and university vice-chancellor
- Profession: Physicist
- Known for: Development of radar
- Awards: Commander of the Order of the British Empire (1942); Medal for Merit (US) (1947)
- Nickname: Jimmy

Military service
- Allegiance: United Kingdom, Australia
- Years of service: 1922–1948 (interbellum, wartime, and post-war civilian defence service under military auspices)

Albert Percival Rowe CBE (23 March 1898 – 25 May 1976), often known as Jimmy Rowe or A. P. Rowe, was a British radar pioneer who played a major role in the development of radar before and during the Second World War. After the war he was the vice-chancellor of the University of Adelaide from 1948 to 1958.

== Early years ==
Albert Percival Rowe, also known as "Jimmy Rowe", was born in Launceston, Cornwall. His parents were Mary Annie née Goudge, and her husband Albert Rowe, a sewing-machine agent. After attending the Portsmouth Naval Dockyard School, he studied physics at the Royal College of Science, University of London, graduating with a honours in 1922. On 18 June 1932, he married Mary Gordon Mathews, a solicitor, in the parish church at Beckenham, Kent. They had no children.

== Air defence and radar ==
After graduation, Rowe joined a defence science unit of the Air Ministry and lectured part time at the Imperial College of Science and Technology from 1927 to 1937. At the Air Ministry, he read everything that he could find on the art of air defence, and became alarmed. Working at that time as the personal assistant to Harry Wimperis, the Air Ministry's first director of scientific research, he wrote a memo to Wimperis that concluded that "Unless science evolved some new method of aiding air defence, we were likely to lose the next war if it starts within the next ten years". In a large scale Air Defence exercise in 1934 involving a mock raid on London, most of the bombers reached their targets without being intercepted.

Wimperis took this seriously, and in 1934, he started the formation of the Committee for the Scientific Survey of Air Defence, which was chaired by Henry Tizard and supported the early development of radio-based detection (RDF). Later, the American term "radar" was adopted. In 1935, Rowe became the secretary of the Committee for the Scientific Survey of Air Defence. He persuaded Wimperis to acquire Bawdsey Manor as a site for the RDF research and development work. In 1937, Rowe had succeeded Robert Watson-Watt as Superintendent of the Bawdsey Research Station, where the Chain Home RDF system was developed, and from 1938 to 1945, he was the Chief Superintendent of the Telecommunications Research Establishment (TRE), which carried out pioneering research on microwave radar. He was appointed a Commander of the Order of the British Empire (CBE) in 1942.

E. H. Putley described Rowe as a complex character with a strong sense of mission, so, difficult to live with. However, Putley supports Rowe's decisions in giving priority, and most of TRE's resources, to the completion of the Chain Home and Chain Home Low systems in 1938–1939, and also continuing research in 1940 on developing aircraft interception radar and centimetric radar with the cavity magnetron. Despite some opposition from RAF Bomber Command, who thought that the project would not produce large-scale results, Rowe, assisted by Alec Reeves, also led in the development of the Oboe navigation system and the ground-scanning H2S radar.

Rowe instituted a practice of bringing military personnel in to meet with the engineers and scientists. These were known as "Sunday Soviets" and were initially held at the Grosvenor Hotel in Swanage. After the TRE moved to Malvern College they were held on site. Any good ideas that were proposed could be approved immediately. This gave the British radar establishment an advantage over their German counterparts, who did not enjoy such a close relationship between military men and scientists. Rowe liked to say that if the Battle of Waterloo was won on the playing fields of Eton, the Battle of Britain was won on the playing fields of Malvern. He wrote about his experiences in his book One Story of Radar (1948). In 1976, Bernard Lovell noted in The Times that "In 1946 Rowe was awarded the American Medal for Merit for his distinguished services to the Allied War effort, but beyond the award of the CBE in 1942, his own country failed to recognise him as one of the critical agents of survival and victory." (Note: Rowe received his Medal for Merit, the highest award the US government can make to a [foreign] civilian, in 1947.)

== Vice-chancellor ==
After the Second World War ended in 1945, Rowe became the Deputy Controller of Research and Development at the Admiralty. The following year, he moved to Australia as chief scientific officer for the British rocket programme. The following year, he was appointed scientific adviser to the Australian Department of Defence, and on 1 May 1948 he became, by invitation, the first full-time vice-chancellor of the University of Adelaide, a position he held until his retirement in 1958. The university was in poor shape. Staff were poorly paid and there was no superannuation scheme. He persuaded the Premier of South Australia, Sir Thomas Playford, to double the university's grant and persuaded the government to create a superannuation scheme to allow academics to retire at age 65. As chairman of the Australian Vice-Chancellors' Committee from 1954 to 1955, he helped persuade the Prime Minister of Australia, Robert Menzies to commission an inquiry, chaired by Sir Keith Murray, that ultimately led to federal funding of Australian universities. Rowe felt that universities should cater more to the average student rather than the brightest, but still demanded excellence from academics. He was openly contemptuous of the humanities and social sciences. He found that he could not run the university the way he ran the TRE and became increasingly unhappy. He chronicled his adventures in Australia in a book, If the Gown Fits (1960).

== Retirement ==
Rowe went back to England, living in Malvern, Worcestershire, where he taught astronomy to boys at Malvern College. He found it difficult to live on his pension, and moved to Malta, where the cost of living was lower, but eventually returned to Malvern. He died in Bromyard Community Hospital in Linton, Herefordshire, on 25 May 1976, and his remains were cremated. His papers are held by the Imperial War Museum.

== Sources ==
- Bowen, E. G. (1987). Radar Days. CRC Press. ISBN 0-7503-0586-X. OCLC 1301430959.
- Latham, Colin; Stobbs, Anne (1999). Pioneers of Radar. Stroud: Sutton. ISBN 0-7509-2120-X. OCLC 44775461.
- Rowe, A. P. (2015) [1948]. One Story of Radar. Cambridge: Cambridge University Press. ISBN 978-1-107-49479-4. OCLC 922009421.
