= Edward Fennessy =

English electrical engineer (1912–2009)

Edward "Ned" Fennessy

Sir Edward Fennessy CBE (17 January 1912 – 21 November 2009) was an English electronics engineer who helped lead several developments of early radar systems under Robert Watson-Watt and went on to lead development of a variety of radio navigation systems. In the post-war era he led the development of the Decca Navigator System and the company's subsequent expansion to become a leader in maritime radar systems. He later worked for Plessey before becoming a managing director of British Telecommunications Research and then becoming deputy chairman of the General Post Office. He is also known as the recruiter of Arthur C Clarke as a radar technician during the war.

== Before the war ==
Fennessy was born in West Ham, Essex and educated at St Bonaventure's Grammar School in Forest Gate. His early academic career was not spectacular, and he graduated with a second-class degree from East London College in 1934. He had been active experimenting with electrical equipment starting at the age of 10, and this proved useful during the job hunt. He and Geoffrey Roberts joined Standard Telephones and Cables soon after graduation. Here he worked on "sound location amplifiers".

== War efforts ==
In 1937 Roberts was called to work with Robert Watson-Watt at Watt's secret radar development centre at Bawdsey Manor, Suffolk. He apparently called for Fennessy to join him, but Fennessy was initially rejected as unsuitable. As experimentation turned to development a need for engineers developed, and Fennessy was summoned to Bawdsey in 1938, shortly after marrying Marion Banks (died 1983), with whom he had two children.

On 29 October 1938 Roberts and Fennessy made the now-famous "night dash" from Bawdsey to meet Air Chief Marshal Sir Hugh Dowding on the opening night of the Munich Crisis. Explaining the problems co-ordinating the information from radar, and the edge this would give the RAF if this problem were addressed, the two convinced Dowding to set up the famous fighter operations room in a cellar at Fighter Command headquarters. All of this was completed in only 36 hours. At the time only five Chain Home stations were operational, a number Roberts considered barely functional, and Fennessy turned his attention to rapidly building new stations to complete the network.

As the war opened, Watt worried that its location on the east coast made Bawdsey open to attack, and proposed moving the entire centre to Dundee, Scotland. Fennessy pressed for the now operational sections to be separated from the research arm. This led to the creation of "No. 60 Group RAF" in Leighton Buzzard, Bedfordshire, not far from London. Watt's research arm moved several times in the next few years, before becoming the Telecommunications Research Establishment in Malvern.

At 60 Group, Fennessy led the operational deployment of many radar and radio navigation systems. These included the development of portable radar systems, and both Gee and Oboe navigation systems. One particularly ironic development concerns the Sonne long-range radio navigation system set up by the Luftwaffe. Sonne proved so useful to RAF Coastal Command that when pushing back of the front lines by the Allies meant Germany no longer had access to Spain, Fennessy arranged for spare parts to be delivered to the Sonne broadcasters located there.

In late 1943 Fennessy prepared a plan for navigation and pathfinding systems to support an amphibious landing on the continent. He selected Normandy as his example location, and when he presented the plan he was detained by Provost Marshals until he convinced them that this was accidental. He was then "bigoted" into planning for the invasion, and given the task of making the plan come to fruition. He was Mentioned in Despatches and appointed to the Order of the British Empire (OBE) in 1944, Commander of the Order of the British Empire (CBE) in 1957, and knighted in 1975.

== After the war ==
Fennessy was demobilised as a Group Captain in the RAF Volunteer Reserve in 1945. For five years he commanded No 3700 (City of London) Radar Reporting Unit. In 1946 he took a position with the Decca Navigator Company, a recent spin-off from Decca Records created to commercialise the Decca Navigator System built by the company during the war. By 1950 Fennessy had completed development of low-cost radar systems, leading to another spin-off, Decca Radar, with Fennessy as the managing director.

Decca held a commanding lead in the UK civil maritime radar world for many years, and was a major player worldwide. In 1952 he led efforts that eventually won the contract for the RAF's "Type 80 radar", and opened a large factory at Cowes on the Isle of Wight to produce them. This factory remained a major radar factory throughout its history.

In 1965 Decca Radar was sold to Plessey to become the Plessey Radar Company. Fennessy remained as the managing director of the new company. He moved into telecommunications research when Plessey and GEC formed a joint effort to build satellite ground stations. In 1969 Fennessy became the managing director of British Telecommunications Research, part of the General Post Office.

In 1975 he was promoted to become the Post Office's deputy chairman, where he led an effort to get phones into the field. At the time there was a 225,000 person long waiting list for phones, mostly due to the lack of switching capability. He solved this problem by deploying truck-based mobile switches formerly used by the military. That year he presented the 20 millionth telephone in the UK, which was also the 5 millionth in London.

== Last years/death ==
After retiring in 1977, he took on a number of consultancy jobs; including IMA Microwave Products and British Medical Data Systems, among others. A widower in 1983, he remarried Leonora Patricia Birkett the following year. He was survived by his second wife, his two children from his first marriage, and four grandchildren - one of whom is the Canadian writer Camilla Gibb.
