= Francis Jones (physicist) =

British physicist

Francis Jones MBE FRS FREng FIEE FRAeS FInstP

Managing Director, Mullard
- In office 1962–1972

Technical Director, Mullard
- In office 1956–1962

Deputy Director & Chief Scientific Officer, Royal Aircraft Establishment
- In office 1952–1956

Personal details
- Born: Francis Edgar Jones; 16 January 1914 Wolverhampton, Staffordshire, England
- Died: 10 April 1988 (aged 74)
- Occupation: Physicist

Francis Edgar Jones (16 January 1914 – 10 April 1988) was a British physicist who co-developed the Oboe blind bombing system.

== Education ==
Jones was born in Wolverhampton, the son of a teacher. In 1921, the family moved to Dagenham, Essex, where he attended the Royal Liberty School at Romford. He then attended King's College London.

== Research ==
During World War II, Jones worked in the Telecommunications Research Establishment (TRE) and collaborated with Alec Harley Reeves to develop the Oboe blind bombing system. After the war he directed investigations in the Basic Research Division of TRE on the detection and properties of infra-red and millimetre-wave radiation. He also made very accurate measurements of propagation velocity of electro-magnetic radiation at radio frequencies and studied applications of radar in meteorology. He became Deputy Head of the Division (later renamed the Physics Department, Royal Radar Establishment).

In 1953, as Chief Scientific Officer and Deputy Director, Royal Aircraft Establishment (Farnborough), he initiated joint rocket programme with Royal Society for exploration of upper atmosphere and, together with Desmond King-Hele, studied the orbits of artificial satellites. In 1957 he was co-author with R.A. Smith and R.P. Chasmar of The Detection and Measurement of Infra-Red Radiation.

== Awards and honours ==
Jones was elected a Fellow of the Royal Society in 1969. He was awarded an MBE in 1945.
