= Joe Airey =

British telecommunications engineer

Joseph Enoch Airey OBE
- Born: 25 August 1894
- Died: 10 February 1976 (aged 81); Poole
- Occupation: Engineer

Joseph Enoch Airey MBE (25 August 1894 – 10 February 1976) was a British telecommunications engineer. He became Senior Technical Officer for the Telecommunications Research Establishment.

== Life ==
Airey was born in Oldham, Lancashire on 25 August 1894. He joined Robert Watson-Watt in 1924, and was an original member of the radar team, responsible for masts and support equipment. He was Senior Technical Officer at Telecommunications Research Establishment. Alongside Arnold Wilkins, Airey is credited with having discovered Bawdsey Manor, Ordfordness as a site for the Air Ministry department that was significant in the history of radar. In his book "Three Steps to Victory" Robert Watson-Watt proclaims Joe Airey's greatest constructional achievement as the installation of a mast atop the Great Pyramid at Cheops. During World War I, Airey was a member of the Dunsterforce in the Persia and the Middle East. By the time of his retirement, he was Station Engineer at the Royal Radar Establishment. He was appointed a Member of the Order of the British Empire (MBE) for his services by King George VI in his Birthday Honours on 14 June 1945. Airey died in Poole Dorset on 10 February 1976.

== See also ==
- History of radar
