= Alec Reeves =

English engineer (1902–1971)

Alec Harley Reeves CBE (10 March 1902 – 13 October 1971) was an English scientist best known for his invention of pulse-code modulation (PCM). He was awarded 82 patents.

== Early life ==
Alec Reeves was born in Redhill, Surrey in 1902 and was educated at the Reigate Grammar School, followed by a scholarship to the City and Guilds Engineering College in 1918, and then postgraduate studies at Imperial College London in 1921.

== Career ==
Reeves joined the International Western Electric Company in 1923, and was part of a team of engineers responsible for the first commercial transatlantic telephone link. In 1925 Western Electric's European operations were acquired by ITT, and in 1927 Reeves was transferred to ITT's research laboratories in Paris. Whilst in Paris, he was responsible for a number of projects, including: a short-wave radio link between the telephone networks of Spain and South America, the world's first single-sideband radio telephone system, and for developing a multi-channel carrier system for UHF radio telephones. He was also responsible for innovations in the design of automatic frequency control circuits, digital delay lines and condenser microphones.

=== Pulse Code Modulation ===
Reeves recognised the potential that pulse-code modulation had for reducing noise when speech is transmitted over long distances. With an analogue signal, every time the signal is amplified, the noise contained in the signal is also amplified and new, additional noise is added. With pulse code modulation, all that is required is to regenerate the pulses, hence the noise content of the signal is not increased. Reeves patented the invention in 1938. However, his idea required quite complex circuitry (by 1930s standards) that was not cost-effective using valves. Pulse code modulation was not used commercially until the 1950s when the invention of the transistor made it viable, although it was used by Bell Telephone Laboratories during the Second World War for secure communications links, such as the SIGSALY system used for encrypted voice communications between Roosevelt and Churchill.

=== World War II ===
Following the invasion of France by Germany in 1940, Reeves escaped over the Spanish border and then made his way back to England aboard a cargo ship. He joined the Royal Aircraft Establishment at Farnborough and took part in the development of countermeasures against the German radio navigation systems, the so-called 'battle of the beams'. Reeves was later transferred to the Telecommunications Research Establishment as part of a team of scientists and engineers developing Britain's own radio navigation aids. The first system they developed was called 'GEE', a system that performed well, but was susceptible to jamming and was not accurate enough for blind bombing of targets at night or through thick cloud. Together with Frank Jones of the Telecommunications Research Establishment, Reeves developed a new system called 'Oboe', which offered pin-point accuracy to within 50 yds (45m), and was resistant to jamming. 'Oboe' was to prove invaluable to the Royal Air Force, during Bomber Command's offensive against Germany.

=== Post War ===
After the war, Alec Reeves managed a team led by Charles K. Kao and George Hockham at Standard Telecommunication Laboratories – initially at Enfield, North London, and later at Harlow Essex – which invented optical fibres as a means of communicating large quantities of information. Kao was awarded the 2009 Nobel Prize in physics for his part in this achievement. Reeves worked at STL until retirement. He was awarded the Stuart Ballantine Medal in 1965 and also the CBE in 1969.

== See also ==
- Telecommunications Research Establishment
