= Telecommunications Research Establishment =

Former British radar research organisation

Coordinates: 52.100°N 2.316°W

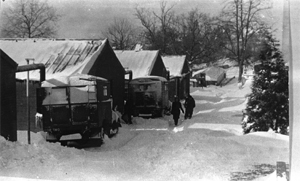
Huts of the TRE, Malvern, winter 1942-3

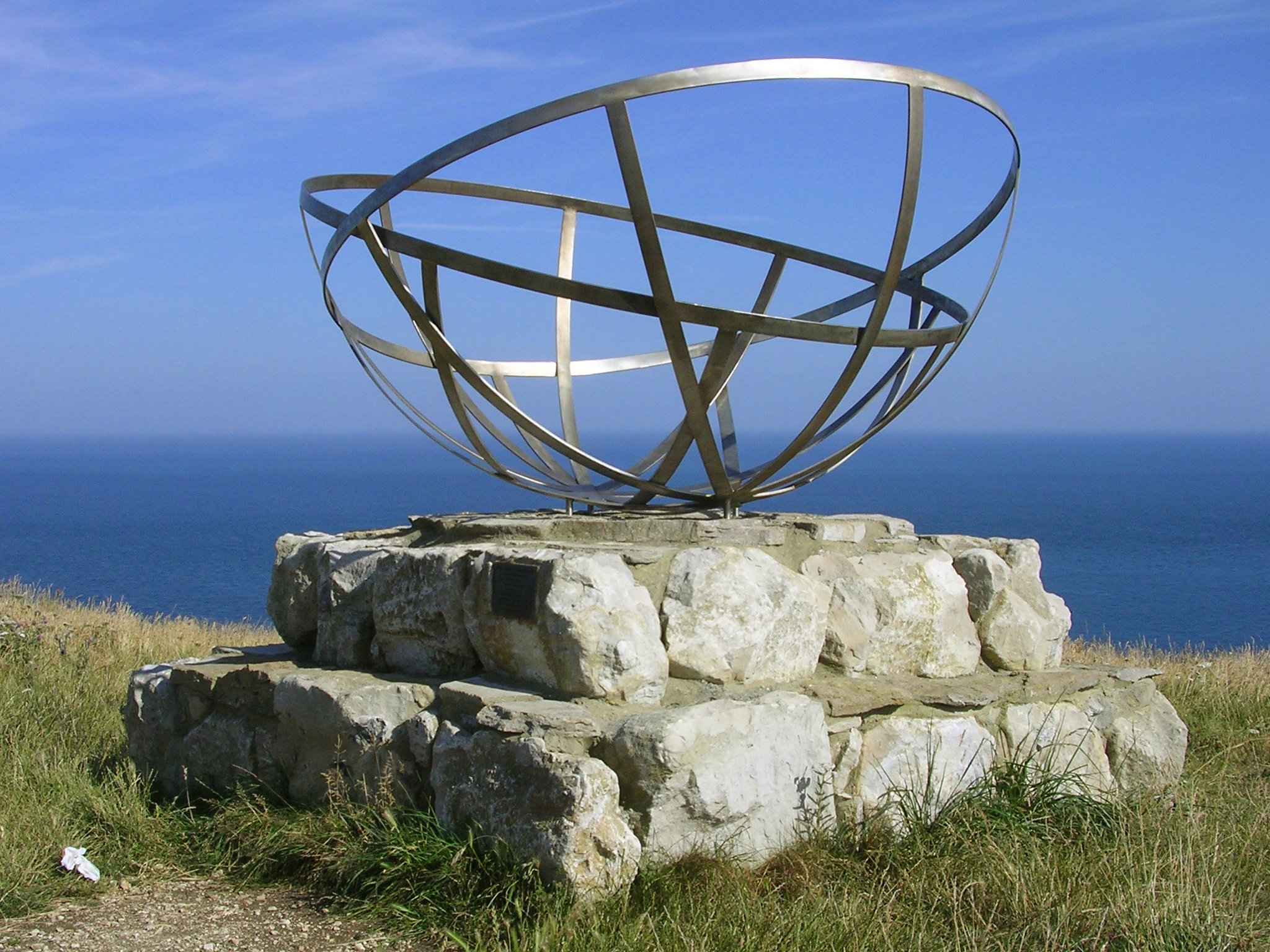
Radar research memorial at St Aldhelm's Head near Worth Matravers, unveiled by Sir Bernard Lovell

The Telecommunications Research Establishment (TRE) was the main United Kingdom research and development organisation for radio navigation, radar, infra-red detection for heat seeking missiles, and related work for the Royal Air Force (RAF) during World War II and the years that followed. It was regarded as "the most brilliant and successful of the English wartime research establishments [under] Rowe, who saw more of the English scientific choices between 1935 and 1945 than any single man."

The name was changed to Radar Research Establishment in 1953, and again to the Royal Radar Establishment in 1957. This article covers the precursor organisations and the Telecommunications Research Establishment up to the time of the name change. The later work at the site is described in the separate article about RRE.

== History ==
TRE is best known for work on defensive and offensive radar. TRE also made substantial contributions to radio-navigation and to jamming enemy radio-navigation. Radar dominated the organisation's activities.

The organisation was originally at Bawdsey, later moving to Dundee and then to the small village of Worth Matravers around 4 miles (6.4 km) from Swanage, where it was renamed TRE. It subsequently moved to Malvern and then amalgamated with other establishments to become the Royal Radar Establishment.

=== Bawdsey ===
The development of radar in the United Kingdom was started by Sir Henry Tizard's Committee for the Scientific Survey of Air Defence in 1935. Experimental work was begun under the direction of Robert Watson-Watt at Orfordness near Ipswich. Looking for a suitable permanent location, one of the team members recalled an empty manor house a short distance south of Orfordness and the location became Bawdsey Research Station (BRS) in 1936. At that time, the team became known as the Air Ministry Experimental Station (AMES).

=== Dundee ===
Bawdsey was only a short E-boat dash across the North Sea from the Netherlands, a fact that was not lost on the Air Ministry. Watson-Watt planned to move the teams to a safer location in the event of war, and approached the rector of his alma mater, University College at Dundee. It is not clear whose fault it was, but when the war opened in 1939 the AMES teams rushed to Dundee they found the rector was only dimly aware of the earlier conversation and nothing had been prepared. By this time the students had returned for the autumn term and consequently there was little room for the researchers.

In addition to lacking room at the University, the teams working on aircraft interception (AI) radar were sent to RAF Scone, a small, formerly civilian airfield near Perth that was entirely unsuited to the scale of their work. Complaints by one of the AI team members worked their way up to higher levels of the Ministry, which led to a search for a more suitable location. Late in the year, the AI team was moved to RAF St Athan in Wales, but ultimately found the location to be only marginally better than Perth.

The "Army Cell" that had formed to take advantage of the AMES research initially followed their moves. In 1941, they moved to join their colleagues of the Air Defence Experimental Establishment who had recently moved from RAF Biggin Hill to Christchurch, Dorset on the south coast of England. The merged group became the Air Defence Research and Development Establishment (ADRDE).

=== Worth Matravers ===
By the early part of 1940, it was clear that the location in Dundee was unworkable. A new location was ultimately selected west of Worth Matravers on the south coast of England, a short distance from the ADRDE teams. The location had a number of advantages, including good views over the English Channel, not unlike the ones they had at Bawdsey. There was also no infrastructure at the site, which had to be hurriedly prepared. As there was no real village at the site, the location is often referred to as Swanage, a seaside resort town around 4 mi (6.4 km) to the east.

The move took place in late May 1940 and further annoyance was created when the careful planning for the move was upset with the AI team arrived first. On arrival, what was AMES was renamed again as the Ministry of Aircraft Production Research Establishment (MAPRE). It was established as the central research group for Royal Air Force (RAF) uses of radar. The name was once again changed to the Telecommunications Research Establishment (TRE) in November 1940.

=== Malvern ===
In parallel with these technical developments, the Ministry of Home Security developed a plan, early in 1939, "to evacuate the critical functions of government out of London" if a threat of air raids developed. A site was purchased in Malvern for the Ministry itself. Although it was not developed, the location had become well known to defence officials. The Air Ministry acquired jurisdiction, and used the site for a Signals Training Establishment, housed in prefabricated one storey buildings. In May 1942, the Radar Research and Development Establishment (RRDE) was set up on the site, to develop truck mounted early warning radars.

In the second week of February 1942, the German battleships Scharnhorst and Gneisenau escaped from Brest in the Channel Dash. They were undetected until well into the English Channel because German ground forces had gradually increased the jamming of British radar over a period of weeks. The British command had not realised this was happening.

In the aftermath, the Chief of Combined Operations, Lord Louis Mountbatten, and the Prime Minister, Winston Churchill, approved plans for a raid on the German radar station at Bruneval, near Le Havre. The landing party included D. H. Preist, of TRE. The Bruneval raid (code-named Operation Biting) captured a German Würzburg radar system along with a radar operator, which were retrieved and subsequently studied at the TRE. During the weeks that followed, the British authorities became concerned that the Germans would retaliate in kind. Accordingly, the TRE relocated from the Swanage site. The former Telecommunications Research Establishment moved to Malvern, taking up residence in the buildings of Malvern College, an independent boys' boarding school.

At the end of the conflict, TRE moved from Malvern College, to HMS Duke, a Royal Navy training school.

== Research and development ==
=== Radio navigation ===
Radio navigation (navigational beam) systems are based on the transmission of pulsed radio beams that are detected by aircraft. R. J. Dippy devised the GEE (also called AMES Type 7000) radio navigation system at TRE, where it was developed into a powerful instrument for increasing the accuracy of bombing raids. To provide coverage of the entire UK, three Gee chains were constructed under the direction of Edward Fennessy. Overall, 60,000 Gee sets were manufactured during the Second World War and the system was adopted by the RAF, USAAF, and Royal Navy.

=== Radio jamming ===
The counter measure to radio navigation was jamming. R. V. Jones was the MI6 science advisor and TRE staff worked closely with him in countering the Luftwaffe's navigational beam technology to hamper the enemy's ability to do pinpoint night bombing raids in what has become known as the "battle of the beams". Robert Cockburn of the TRE was responsible for the development of the Jostle IV radio jammer — the most powerful jammer device used over Europe. At 2 kW output it could block all VHF transmissions over 32-48 MHz. However, enclosed in its own pressurised container, (to prevent arcing of the high voltages inside), it was large and at 600 lb took up the entirety of the bomb bay of the Boeing B-17 used by No. 100 Group RAF. Due to the high transmitter power, test flights had to be carried out in the vicinity of Iceland, otherwise the jamming would have blanked out all frequencies in the specified range, over a large area, as well as giving the Germans warning of the impending arrival of a jamming system.

=== Radar ===
The development of radar for defensive and offensive operations was of paramount concern during the war. Early work was on aircraft interception (AI) radar that was able to be carried in night fighters and used for locating enemy aircraft in the dark, as Britain was soon facing The Blitz. The first tests had been carried out as early as 1936–7 using a Handley Page Heyford and later an Avro Anson at the initial suggestion of Henry Tizard then Chairman of the Aeronautical Research Committee. Initial aircraft used operationally were Bristol Blenheims converted to fighters with belly gun packs, followed by a brief usage of the AI radar-equipped Turbinlite Douglas Havoc paired with Hawker Hurricanes, but later the Bristol Beaufighter was chosen, followed by the de Havilland Mosquito which later became the standard RAF night fighter for the remainder of the war. Initial versions of AI radar were metric-wavelength, the antennas being arrow-shaped or dipoles, later centimetric versions used a rotating paraboloid aerial carried under a streamlined nose radome. Aircraft interception radar progressed from the initial AI Mk I version to the AI Mk 24 Foxhunter used in the Panavia Tornado.

Parallel work was carried out on air-to-surface-vessel (ASV) radar for use by Coastal Command aircraft for hunting U-boats at sea, initially using the Lockheed Hudson equipped with an early version of ASV. Success with the new equipment led to mounting the equipment onto Vickers Wellingtons and Sunderland flying boats, the early metric-wavelength ASV-equipped types carrying an array of transmitting and receiving "Stickleback" aerials on the rear fuselage top and sides and under the wings. Later a version of the centimetric-wavelength H2S was used. ASV-equipped aircraft such as the Wellington, Sunderland, Catalina and Liberator, made a substantial contribution to winning the Battle of the Atlantic for the Allies. ASV-equipped Fairey Swordfish and Fairey Barracudas were carried on board aircraft carriers, the Swordfish being flown from the smaller escort carriers where they formed a valuable anti-submarine presence when used over the numerous North Atlantic convoys.

The Oboe blind bombing system was designed and developed by Frank Jones at TRE in collaboration with Alec Reeves at the Royal Aircraft Establishment. Oboe transponders were fitted to Mosquitoes of 109 Squadron, which developed the use of the device as part of the Pathfinder Force. The Mosquito was chosen because the transponder device mounted in the airplane was not large, and its use required the aircraft to fly for 10 minutes on a straight and level course. That being the case speed was essential to avoid being intercepted. In addition, the Mosquito could reach 30,000 feet altitude, and this improved the range across the continent that the device could be used over.

The H2S radar used the newly developed cavity magnetron. It was carried by RAF bombers to identify ground targets for night and all-weather bombing. Initial trials were with a Handley Page Halifax and, despite setbacks, the equipment later became a standard fitting on Halifaxes, Short Stirlings and Avro Lancasters. It was also fitted to the post-war Vickers Valiant, Avro Vulcan, Handley Page Victor, and bomber versions of the English Electric Canberra. H2S in its final form of H2S Mk 9 was still being used on Vulcans as late as the 1982 Falklands War. C. E. Wynn-Williams worked on these navigational radars, but was transferred to cryptographic work at Bletchley Park.

The Automatic Gun-Laying Turret (AGLT) was an airborne radar used in bombers by the gunners against attack by fighter aircraft. It was designed by Philip Dee and developed by Alan Hodgkin. The device allowed a turret gunner to fire at and hit a target without ever needing to see it. Known by the codename 'Village Inn', the AGLT was installed in a number of Lancasters and Halifaxes and used operationally during the war, and was also fitted on some post-war Avro Lincolns.

Radar trainers were designed and developed by Geoffrey Dummer.

The priority that Winston Churchill placed on the development and deployment of radar is described by Sir Bernard Lovell: Every day Sir Robert Renwick would phone Lovell or Dee, asking "any news, any problems" [and these would be] dealt with by Renwick's immediate access to Churchill.

=== Other work ===
Cathode-ray tubes, for radar display, and a variety of electronic components were developed under direction of Geoffrey Dummer.

Flight simulators were developed by A. M. Uttley.

Electronic computer systems were developed by Philip Woodward, specifically the software of one of the first British electronic computers, the TRE Automatic Computer (TREAC)

In 1942, the staffing level was about 2,000 people; by 1945, increased electronics production had increased this number to around 3,500 staff.

== Successor organisations ==
TRE was combined with the Radar Research and Development Establishment in 1953 to form the Radar Research Establishment. This organisation was renamed the Royal Radar Establishment in 1957.

It became the Royal Signals and Radar Establishment in 1976 when the Army Signals Research and Development Establishment (SRDE) moved to Malvern.

It was made part of the Defence Research Agency (DRA) in April 1991, which was renamed Defence Evaluation and Research Agency (DERA) in April 1995.

In July 2001, it was split into two entities comprising the private sector company QinetiQ, and the wholly government owned Defence Science and Technology Laboratory (Dstl).

== Staff and their contributions ==
Staff were affectionately known as boffins. They included:

- Joe Airey MBE Joined radar radio research in 1924. Worked at various TRE locations. Responsible for masts and other equipment. Was Senior Technical Officer at the time he was awarded the MBE. Rose to Station Manager RSRE by the time of his retirement.
- James Atkinson. Worked at Malvern on cathode-ray tubes, Chain Home stations, radar, super-refraction and infra-red detectors; later, at the University of Glasgow on nuclear photo-disintegration; and in administration at UKAEA Dounreay, the British Ship Research Association and Heriot-Watt University.
- C. E. Bellinger was one of the people "all of whom achieved eminence in their respective fields".
- Alan Blumlein, electronics pioneer. Starting in 1924, he worked on telecommunications, sound recording, stereo and television at Columbia and then EMI. While attached to Malvern, he developed the line type pulse modulator, a key element of the H2S airborne radar, vital to bombing missions. He died in the crash of an H2S test flight in June 1942, together with fellow TRE/EMI personnel, F/O Geoffrey Hensby RAFVR, B.Sc. Hons, Cecil Browne and Frank Blythen.
- Henry G. Booker, radio-physicist. Between 1933 and World War II, Booker worked in the radio-physics group at the Cavendish Laboratory of Cambridge University with J. A. Ratcliffe on magneto-ionic theory of radio wave propagation in the atmosphere. At Malvern, Booker was in charge of theoretical research, covering antennas, electromagnetic wave propagation, and radar systems. After World War II, he taught mathematics at the University of Cambridge, until joining Cornell University in 1948. In 1965 he moved to the University of California at San Diego. The International Union of Radio Science named a Fellowship in his honour. His publications include four books.
- B. V. Bowden, worked on radar. Later, he became Baron Bowden, of Chesterfield in the County of Derbyshire, Minister for Education and Science in 1964 and Vice-Chancellor of the University of Manchester Institute of Science and Technology.
- E. G. ("Taffy") Bowen (later FRS, CBE) Member of team at Orfordness who, by 1935, had developed the radar that first detected an aircraft. This led to the Chain Home ground-based radar. At Bawdsey, he began development of airborne radar. In 1940 he went to the US with the Tizard Mission. In 1943, he joined the CSIRO in Australia.
- R. P. Chasmar, co-author of definitive text The Detection and Measurement of Infra-red Radiation, Clarendon Press, 1960 and, for many years, Head of the infra-red group at RRE.
- Robert Cockburn, electronics engineer. He directed the development of radar jamming systems (counter measures) code named Window and widely known as Chaff. An obituary describes this work as "a main contributor to the reduction of civilian [air raid]casualties ... and [bomber] losses". He is in a group photograph. Later, he was knighted.
- Joan Curran, invented the Window (Chaff) radio countermeasure system. As Samuel Curran's wife, she became Lady Joan Curran. She also went to the Manhattan Project when he did.
- Samuel Curran, worked on radar at TRE, joined the Manhattan Project in 1944, where he invented the scintillation counter, then the United Kingdom Atomic energy authority where he invented the proportional counter, then became Vice-Chancellor of the Royal College of Science and Technology and led it to become the University of Strathclyde. He was knighted.
- Philip Dee designed the Automatic Gun-Laying Turret, known by the code name Village Inn.
- Robert J. Dippy, electronic engineer, who was a pioneer of radio navigation. He developed and devised GEE and Loran-A of major importance in D-day invasion. He received the Pioneer Award of the IEEE in 1966 for hyperbolic radio navigation.
- G. W. A. Dummer, electronics engineer. He developed the plan position indicator radar display. As head of Synthetic Trainer Design Group, he was responsible for the design, manufacture, installation and servicing of over 70 types of radar training equipment during World War II. In 1944, he became Divisional Leader of the Physical and Tropical Testing Laboratories and the Component Group, that had responsibility for outside contracts. Later, he was one of the innovators of integrated circuits. For his further work see Royal Radar Establishment and his personal article.
- A. F. Gibson, Head of Transistor Group at RRE, later Head of Laser Division of Rutherford Laboratory.
- Antony Hewish, physicist and radio astronomer. He worked with Martin Ryle at TRE on the design of antennas for airborne radar during World War II. In 1984, they shared the Nobel Prize in Physics.
- Alan Hodgkin was primarily a physiologist and biophysicist, who worked on the Automatic Gun-Laying Turret and later won a Nobel Prize and was knighted.
- "Frank" Jones (Francis Edgar Jones, later FRS, MBE), worked with Alec Reeves at the Royal Aircraft Establishment to design and develop the Oboe blind bombing system.
- Tom Kilburn worked with Freddy Williams on radar at TRE during the war. Later, Kilburn went to the University of Manchester where he was a pioneer of computer hardware, both he and Williams being involved in the design of the Manchester Baby.
- Sir Bernard Lovell, led the H2S development team and was later responsible for the building of the radio telescope at Jodrell Bank.
- G. G. MacFarlane, later knighted
- T. S. Moss, author of definitive monographs Photoconductivity of the elements and Optical Properties of semiconductors.
- W. H. (Bill) Penley, compiler of archives on early history of radar
- John Pinkerton, later developed Leo computer at the Lyons company,
- A. P. ("Jimmy") Rowe, physicist. He was a leader in the development of British radar from its inception, starting in 1934, when he was appointed secretary of the Tizard Committee, He succeeded Robert Watson-Watt as Superintendent of the Bawdsey Research Station, and directed the renamed Telecommunications Research Establishment when it moved to Malvern. After the war, he was appointed first scientific advisor to the government of Australia, and Vice-Chancellor of the University of Adelaide. A pioneer of Operational Research.
- Martin Ryle, physicist and radio astronomer. He worked at the Telecommunications Research Establishment on the design of antennas for airborne radar during the war. Later, he was knighted in 1966, was Astronomer Royal 1978–1982, and shared the Nobel Prize Physics with Antony Hewish in 1984.
- Joshua Sieger, electronics engineer. At Worth Matravers, he designed large-screen displays of radar signals, arranging further components to triangulate a target. At other times, he made many contributions to electronics and communications technology.
- Robert Allan Smith later Professor of Physics at University of Sheffield, Director of the Center for Materials Science and Engineering at MIT, and Vice-Chancellor of Heriot-Watt University
- Prof Charles Holt Smith CBE, former BBC researcher, where he invented the logarithmic peak programme meter (PPM) in the 1930s
- Albert Uttley conducted important research in radar, automatic tracking and early computing at TRE, including the design of an aircraft interception (AI) radar trainer for night fighter crews He was a founder member of the Ratio Club and became group leader at RRE, with a distinctive approach to air defence cybernetics. Left to head the pioneering Autonomics Division at the National Physical Laboratory where he did research on machine intelligence and brain modelling. However, he also became well known as a neuropsychologist, having made several important contributions to the field. Later Professor of Psychology at Sussex University.
- F. C. Williams (Freddy), engineer. He worked on radar and servomechanisms at TRE during the war. Later, Williams moved to the University of Manchester, where he was a pioneer of computer hardware. He was knighted and became an FRS.
- Philip Woodward, mathematician, pioneered the application of probability theory to the filtering of radar signals. After the name change to RRE, he wrote a monograph on the topic. His early results included the Woodward Ambiguity Function, "the standard tool for waveform and matched filter analysis". Member of the Ratio Club.
- C. E. Wynn-Williams worked on navigational radar briefly, and was transferred to cryptographic work at Bletchley Park.
- Leslie Treloar, rheologist and expert on rubber, and Maurice Wilkes, creator of the EDSAC computer and inventor of microprogramming, worked at TRE briefly during World War II.
- Hundreds of other staff members made direct and support contributions to the projects that have been mentioned and to other work of TRE. Many are listed, under the respective group names, by Penley.

== See also ==
- Air Ministry Experimental Station
- RAF Defford
- Radiation Laboratory (MIT)
- Boffin
