= Gee (navigation) =

Radio navigation system

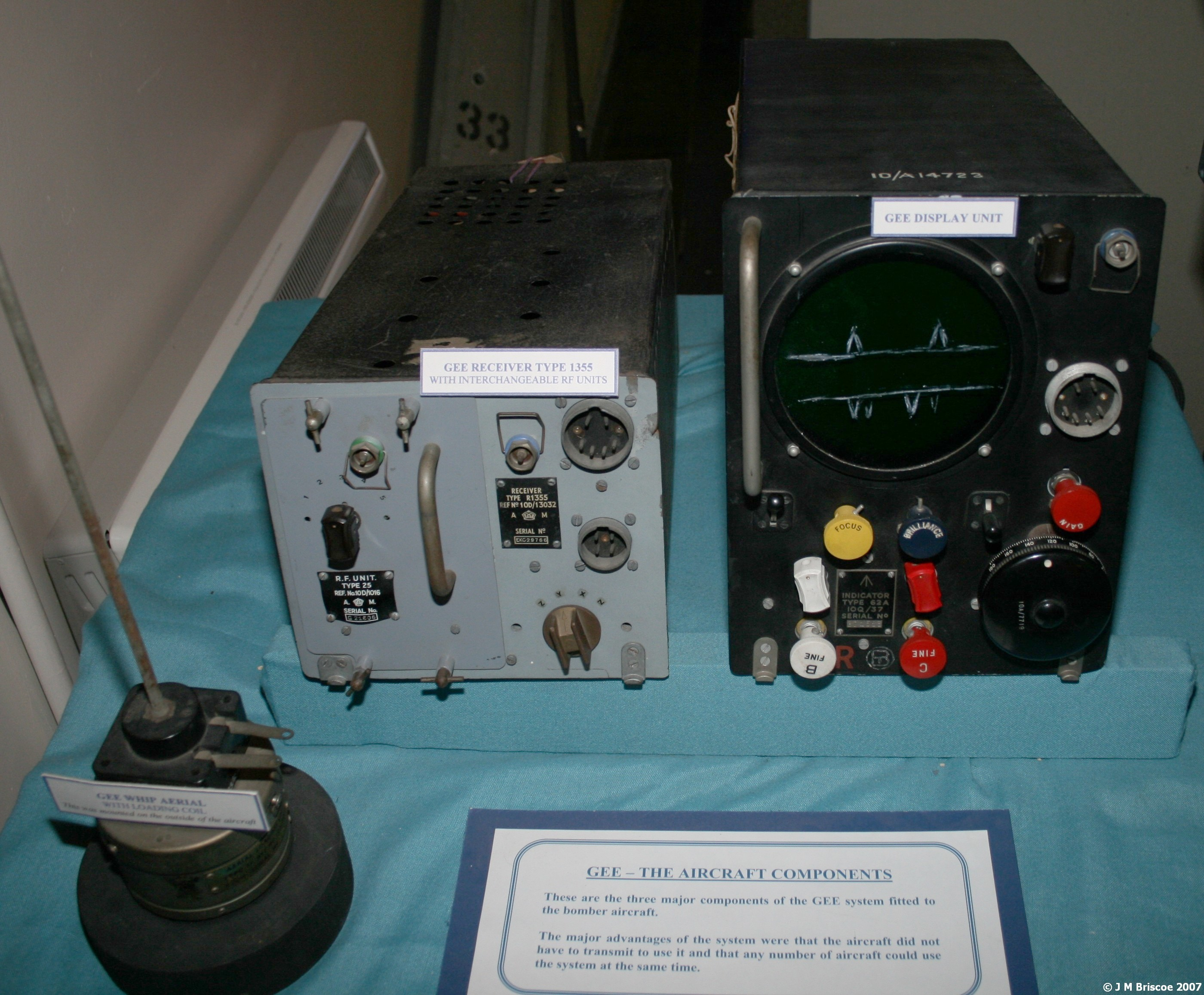
GEE airborne equipment, with the R1355 receiver on the left and the Indicator Unit Type 62A on the right. The 'scope shows a simulated display, including the "ghost" A1 signal.

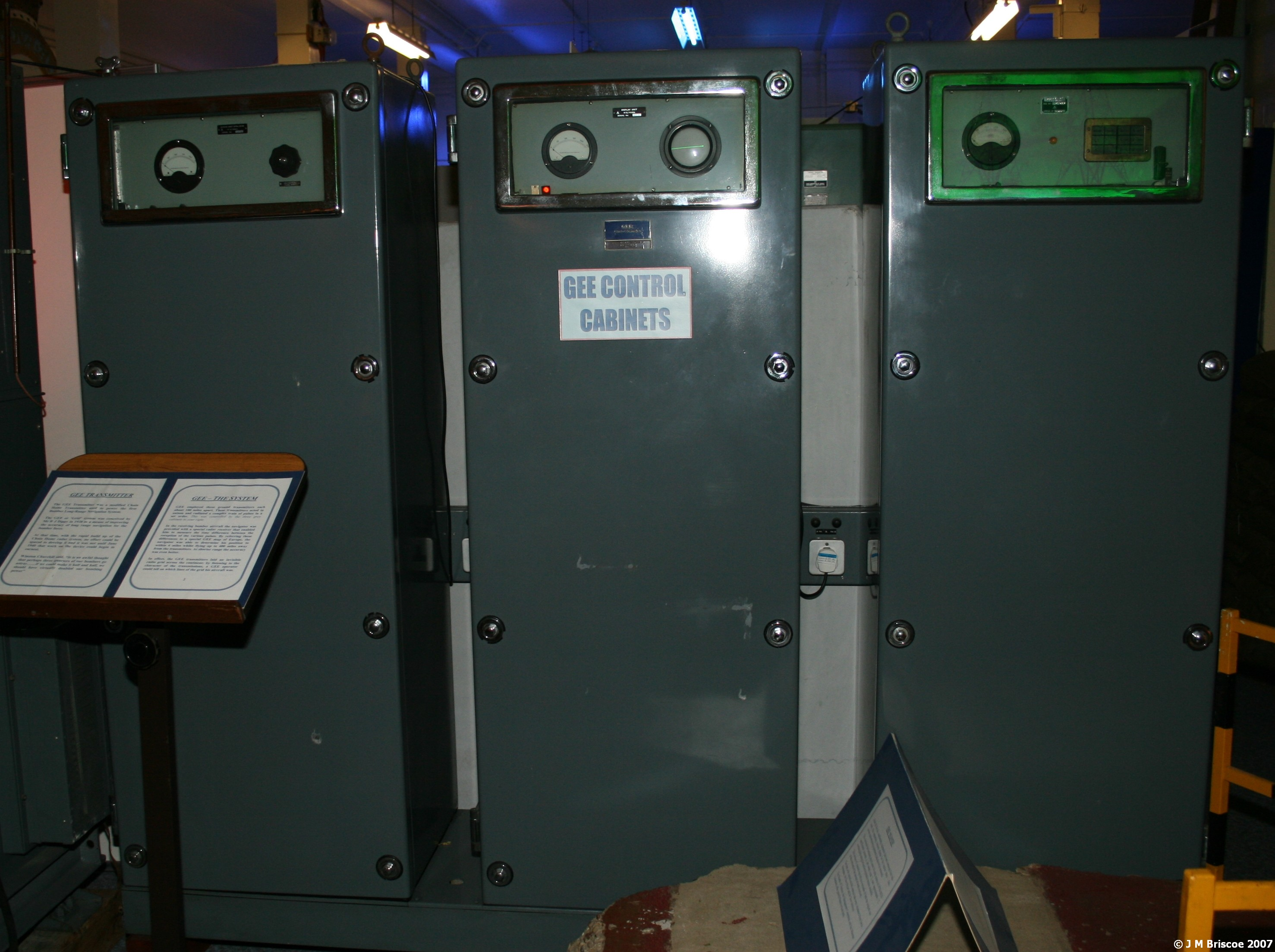
GEE control bays

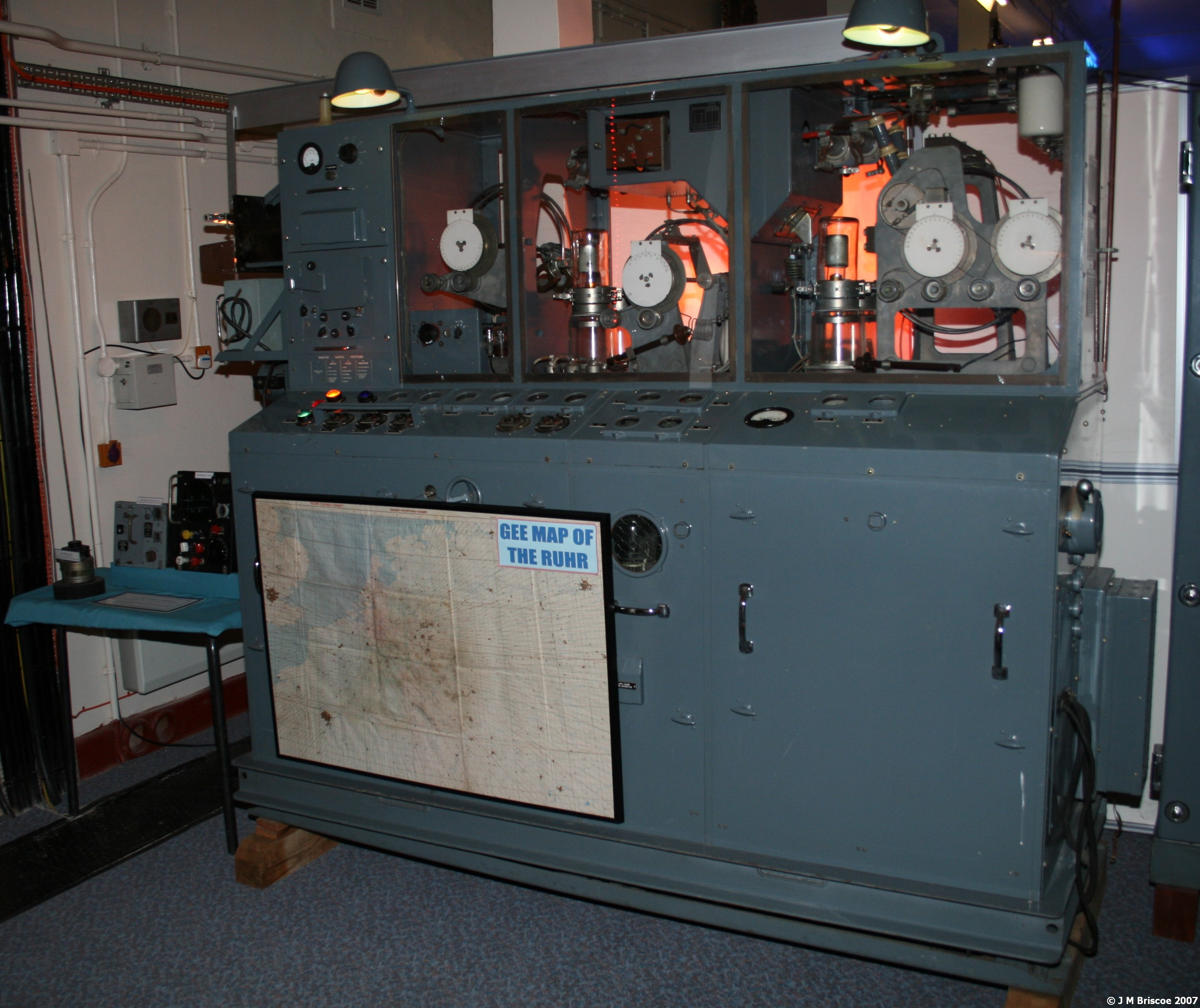
GEE transmitter

Gee, sometimes written GEE, (Note: Different sources record the name as GEE or Gee. The naming supposedly comes from "Grid". "Gee" is used in Dippy's publications. See Dippy 1946. The Air Ministry sometimes referred to it as Gee-7000. or Gee-7000, see "An Introduction Survey of Radar, Part II", Air Ministry, June 1946) was a radio-navigation system used by the Royal Air Force during World War II. It measured the time delay between two radio signals to produce a fix, with accuracy on the order of a few hundred metres at ranges up to about 350 miles (560 km). It was the first hyperbolic navigation system to be used operationally, entering service with RAF Bomber Command in 1942.

Gee was devised by Robert Dippy as a short-range blind-landing system to improve safety during night operations. In the course of development by the Telecommunications Research Establishment (TRE) at Swanage, the range was found to be far better than expected. It then developed into a long-range, general navigation system. For large, fixed targets, such as cities that were attacked at night, Gee offered enough accuracy to be used as an aiming reference without the need to use a bombsight or other external references. Jamming reduced its usefulness as a bombing aid, but it remained in use as a navigational aid in the UK area throughout and after the war.

Gee remained an important part of the RAF's suite of navigation systems in the postwar era, and was included in aircraft such as the English Electric Canberra and the V-bomber fleet. It also had civilian use, and several new Gee chains were set up to support military and civil aviation across Europe. The system started to be shut down in the late 1960s, with the last station going off the air in 1970. Gee inspired the original LORAN ("Loran-A") system, which is essentially a Gee system working at much lower frequencies to give it longer range.

== History ==
=== Prerequisite work ===
The basic idea of radio hyperbolic navigation was well known in the 1930s, but the equipment needed to build it was not widely available at the time. The main problem involved the accurate determination of the difference in timing of two closely spaced signals, differences measured in milli- and microseconds.

During the 1930s, the development of radar demanded devices that could accurately measure these sorts of signal timings. In the case of Chain Home, transmission aerials sent out signals, and any reflections from distant targets were received on separate aerials. An oscilloscope (or oscillograph as it was known in the UK) was used to measure the time between transmission and reception. The transmitter triggered a time base generator that started a "trace" moving quickly along the oscilloscope display. Any received signals caused the beam to deflect downward, forming a blip. The distance that the trace had moved from the left side of the display could be measured to accurately calculate the difference in time between sending and receiving, which, in turn, could be used to calculate the slant range to the target.

Radar can also be used as a navigation system. If two stations are able to communicate, they could compare their measurements of the distance to a target, and use basic trilateration to determine the location. This calculation could then be sent to the aircraft by radio. This is a fairly manpower-intensive operation, and while it was used by both the British and Germans during the war, the workload meant it could generally only be used to guide single aircraft.

=== Landing system proposal ===
In October 1937, Robert (Bob) J. Dippy, working at Robert Watson-Watt's radar laboratory at RAF Bawdsey in Suffolk, proposed using two synchronized transmitters as the basis for a blind landing system. He envisaged two transmitting antennas positioned about 10 miles (16 km) apart on either side of a runway. A transmitter midway between the two antennas would send a common signal over transmission lines to the two antennas, which ensured that both antennas would broadcast the signal at the same instant.

A receiver in the aircraft would tune in these signals and send them to an A-scope-type display, like those used by Chain Home. If the aircraft were properly lined up with the runway, both signals would be received at the same instant, and thus be drawn at the same point on the display. If the aircraft were located to one side or the other, one of the signals would be received before the other, forming two distinct peaks on the display. By determining which signal was being received first, pilots would know that they were closer to that antenna, and would be able to recapture the proper direction by turning away from it. (Note: Although it is not mentioned in available sources, some method of telling the two signals apart would be needed. The solution used on Gee, periodically turning one of them on and off to cause it to oscillate on the display, would work here as well.)

Watt liked the idea, but at the time, a pressing need for the system was not apparent. At the time, the RAF relied on daylight bombing by tight formations of heavily defended bombers as its primary attack force, so night landings were not a major concern. Landing aids would be useful, but radar work was the more urgent need.

=== Navigation system proposal ===
The RAF's bombing campaign plans quickly went awry, especially after the Air Battle of the Heligoland Bight in 1939. Contrary to prewar thinking, the bombers proved extremely vulnerable to both ground fire and attacking fighters. After some discussion, the best course of action was decided to be to return to night bombing, which had been the primary concept earlier in the 1930s.

This raised the need for better landing aids, and for night navigation aids in general. Dippy refined his system for this purpose, and formally presented a new proposal on 24 June 1940. The original design used two transmitters to define a single line in space, down the runway centerline. In his new concept, charts would be produced illustrating not only the line of zero-difference, where the blips were superimposed like the landing system, but also a line where the pulses were received 1 μs apart, and another for 2 μs, etc. The result would be a series of lines arranged at right angles to the line between the two stations.

A single pair of such transmitters would allow the aircraft to determine on which line they were, but not their location along it. For this purpose, a second set of lines from a separate station would be required. Ideally, these lines would be at right angles to the first, producing a two-dimensional grid that could be printed on navigational charts. To ease deployment, Dippy noted that the station in the centre could be used as one side of both pairs of transmitters if they were arranged like an L. Measuring the time delays of the two outlier stations relative to the centre, and then looking up those numbers on a chart, an aircraft could determine its position in space, taking a fix. The gridded lines on the charts gave the systems its name, "Gee" for the "G" in "Grid".

As the system was now intended to offer navigation over a much wider area, the transmitters of a single station would have to be located further apart to produce the required accuracy and coverage. The single-transmitter, multiple-antenna solution of the original proposal was no longer appropriate, especially given that the stations would be located far apart and wiring to a common point would be difficult and expensive. Instead, Dippy described a new system using individual transmitters at each of the stations. One of the stations would periodically send out its signal based on a timer. The other stations would be equipped with receivers listening for the signal arriving from the control station. When they received the signal, they would send out their own broadcasts. This would keep all the stations in synchronization, without the need for a wire between them. Dippy suggested building stations with a central "master" and three "secondaries" about 80 miles (130 km) away and arranged roughly 120 degrees apart, forming a large "Y" layout. A collection of such stations was known as a chain.

The system was expected to operate over ranges around 100 miles (160 km), based on the widely held belief within the UK radio engineering establishment that the 30 MHz shortwave signals would have a relatively short range. With this sort of range, the system would be very useful as an aid for short-range navigation to the airport, as well as helping bombers form up at an arranged location after launch. Additionally, after flying to their cruising altitude, the bombers could use Gee fixes to calculate the winds aloft, allowing them to more accurately calculate dead reckoning fixes after the aircraft passed out of Gee range.

Experimental systems were being set up in June 1940. By July, to everyone's delight, the system clearly was usable to at least 300 miles (480 km) at altitudes of 10,000 feet (3.0 km). On 19 October, a fix was made at 110 miles (180 km) at 5,000 feet.

=== New offensive ===
The discovery of Gee's extended range arrived at a pivotal point in the RAF's bombing campaign. Having originally relied on day bombing, the RAF had not invested a tremendous amount of effort on the navigation skills needed for night flying. When The Blitz night-bombing offensive started, the Germans were found to have developed a series of radio aids for this, notably the X-Gerät system. The RAF initially pooh-poohed this approach, claiming it only demonstrated the superiority of the RAF's training.

By late 1940 a number of reports were trickling back from observers in the field, who were noting that Allied bombers did not appear to be bombing their targets. In one instance, bombs reportedly fell over 50 mi (80 km) from their target. For some time, these results were dismissed, but calls for an official enquiry led to the Butt report, which demonstrated only 5% of the bombs sent out on a mission landed within 5 mi (8 km) of their targets. With these statistics, any sort of strategic campaign based on attacks against factories and similar targets was hopeless. This led to Frederick Lindemann's notorious "dehousing" paper, which called for the bomber efforts to be used against the houses of the German citizens to break their ability to work and will to resist. This became official policy of the RAF in 1942.

While the debate raged, Bomber Command dramatically lowered their sortie rate, awaiting the rebuilding of the force with the newly arriving 4-engine "heavies" such as the Handley Page Halifax and Avro Lancaster, and the deployment of Gee. The two, combined, would offer the accuracy and weight of bombs that Lindemann's calculations called for. Efforts to test and deploy Gee became a high priority, and the Chain Executive Committee was set up under the chairmanship of Robert Renwick in October 1941 to site a series of Gee stations. Gee was not the only solution being developed; it was soon joined by H2S radars and the Oboe system.

=== Near-compromise ===
As the initial availability of the Gee devices would be limited, the idea of the pathfinder force was adopted. This concept had originally been developed by the Luftwaffe for their early night raids against England. Lacking enough radio sets and the widespread training to place their radio navigation systems on all their aircraft, they collected what they had into the single group, 100 Group. 100 Group would then use their equipment to drop flares, which acted as an aiming point for following bombers.

Eager to test the Gee system, prototype sets were used on target indicator aircraft well before the production sets were available in the number required for large raids. On 15 May 1941, such a set provided an accurate fix at a range of 400 miles (640 km) at an altitude of 10,000 feet (3,000 m). The first full transmitter chain was completed in July 1941, but in testing over the North Sea, the sets proved to be unreliable. This was traced to the power supplies and tubes, and corrections were designed and proved that summer.

On the night of 11/12 August, two Gee-equipped aircraft using Gee coordinates only delivered "uncanny accuracy" when dropping their bombs. However, on the next night on a raid over Hanover, a Gee-equipped Vickers Wellington was lost. The Gee set did not contain self-destruct systems, and it might have fallen into German hands. Operational testing was immediately suspended.

R. V. Jones responded by starting a disinformation campaign to hide the existence of the system. First, the use of the codename 'Gee' in communications traffic was dropped, and false communications were sent referring to a fictitious system called 'Jay'; it was hoped the similarity would cause confusion. A double agent in the Double Cross system reported to German Intelligence a fictional story of hearing a couple of RAF personnel talking carelessly in a hotel about Jay, and one dismissing it as it was "just a copy" of the German Knickebein system. Jones felt this would flatter the Germans, who might consider the information more reliable as a result. Extra antennae were added to the Gee transmitters to radiate false, unsynchronized signals. Finally, false Knickebein signals were transmitted over Germany. Jones noted all this appealed to his penchant for practical joking.

In spite of these efforts, Jones initially calculated only 3 months would be needed before the Germans would be able to jam the system. As it turns out, jamming was not encountered until five months into the campaign, and it was much longer before it became a serious concern.

=== Into service ===
Even with limited testing, Gee proved itself to be easy to use and more than accurate enough for its tasks. On 18 August 1941, Bomber Command ordered Gee into production at Dynatron and Cossor, with the first mass-produced sets expected to arrive in May 1942. In the meantime, a separate order for 300 hand-made sets was placed for delivery on 1 January 1942, which was later pushed back to February. Overall, 60,000 Gee sets were manufactured during World War II, used by the RAF, USAAF, and Royal Navy.

The first operational mission using Gee took place on the night of 8/9 March 1942, when a force of about 200 aircraft attacked Essen. It was installed on a Wellington of No. 115 Squadron from RAF Watton captained by Pilot Officer Jack Foster, who later said, "targets were found and bombed as never before". Krupp, the principal target, escaped bombing, but bombs did hit the southern areas of the city. In total, 33% of the aircraft reached the target area, an enormous advance over earlier results.

The first completely successful Gee-led attack was carried out on 13/14 March 1942 against Cologne. The leading crews successfully illuminated the target with flares and incendiaries and the bombing was generally accurate. Bomber Command calculated that this attack was five times more effective than the earlier raid on the city. The success of Gee led to a change in policy, selecting 60 German cities within Gee range for mass bombing using 1,600–1,800 tons of bombs per city.

To provide coverage of the entire UK, three Gee chains were constructed under the direction of Edward Fennessy. The original chain started continuous operation on 22 June 1942, followed by a chain in Scotland later that year, and the southwest chain in 1943. Even as German jamming efforts took hold, Gee remained entirely useful as a short-range navigation system over the UK. Only 1.2% of Gee-equipped aircraft failed to return to their base, as opposed to 3.5% of those without it. Gee was considered so important that an unserviceable Gee set would ground an aircraft.

One illustration of Gee's routine employment by Bomber Command in navigation tasks was its use (albeit a limited one) in Operation Chastise (commonly known as the "Dam Buster Raid") in May 1943. In his memoir, Enemy Coast Ahead, Guy Gibson, the leader of the raid, briefly mentions his navigator, F/O 'Terry' Taerum, RCAF, employing what Gibson calls Taerum's "G Box" to determine groundspeed while flying very low at night over the North Sea from Britain to Holland, en route to Germany.

=== Upgrades ===
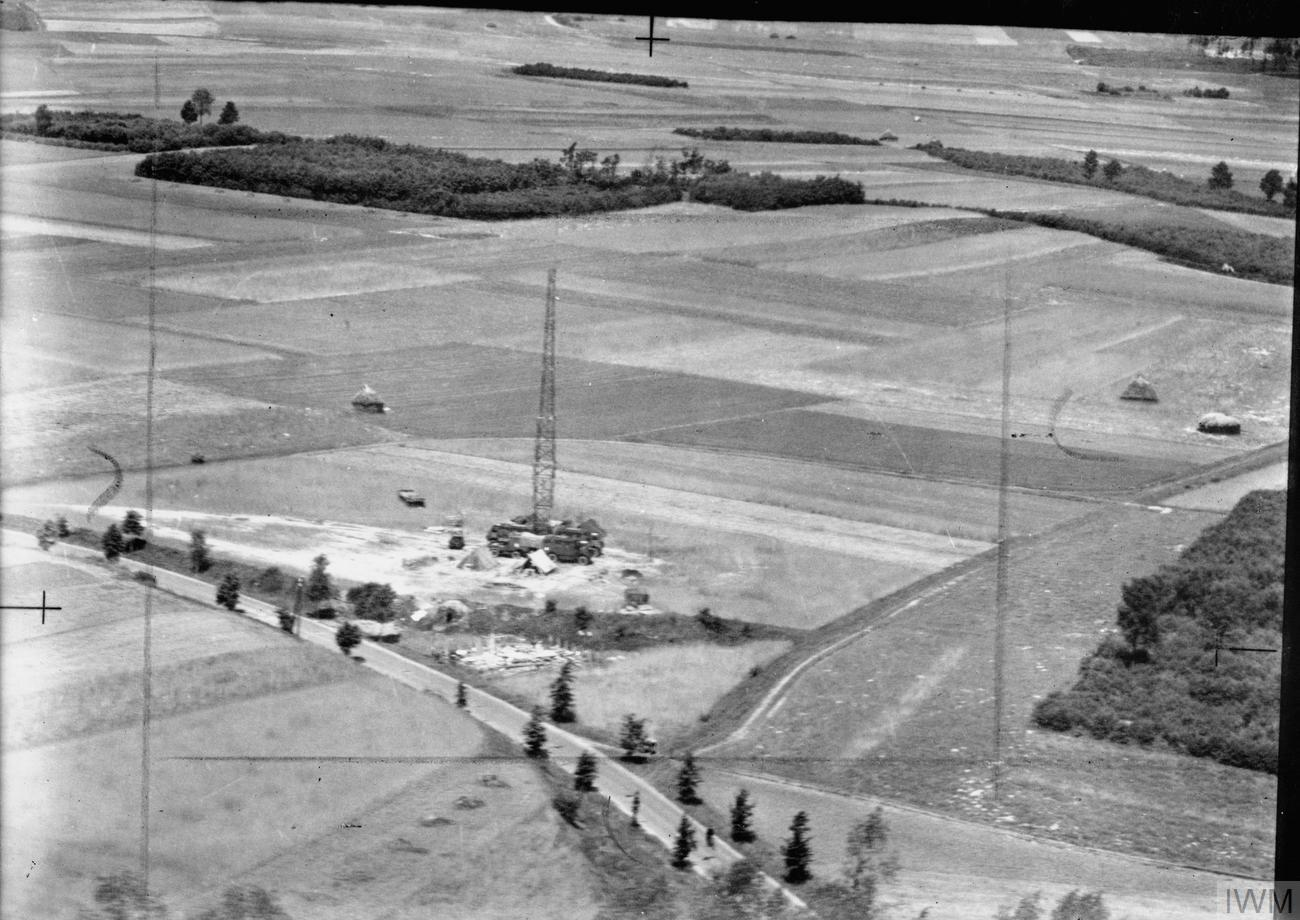
Low-level photo of a light mobile Gee station operating in a field near Roermond, Holland. These forward stations provided Gee coverage deeper into Germany, as well as strong signals for aircraft returning to bases in Western Europe.

The first serious jamming was encountered on the night of 4/5 August 1942. This grew in strength as the bombers approached their target at Essen, and the signals became unusable at 10 to 20 miles (16–32 km) from the target. The newly formed southern chain was not yet known to the Germans and continued to be useful. On 3/4 December, a fix was made from this chain over Turin in Italy, at a range of 730 miles (1,170 km). This remained the operational record for Gee, bested only by a freak reception over Gibraltar at a range of 1,000 miles (1,600 km).

Counter-jamming efforts had already been considered, and resulted in the Gee Mk. II. This replaced the original receiver with a new model where the oscillators could be easily removed and swapped out to provide a range of operational frequencies. These included the original 20–30 MHz band, as well as new bands at 40–50, 50–70, and 70–90 MHz. The navigator could replace these in flight, allowing reception from any active chain. Gee Mk. II went into operation in February 1943, at which point it had also been selected by the US 8th Air Force.

On 23 April 1942, the go-ahead was given to develop mobile stations for Gee in preparation for the invasion of Europe. This would not only extend the range of the system eastward, but also allow stations to move and suddenly appear elsewhere if jamming became an issue. The first of an eventual three such mobile chains was formed up on 22 November 1943. This was put into operation on 1 May 1944 at Foggia in Italy, and was used operationally for the first time on 24 May. Other units were sent into France soon after D-Day. The mobile units in France and Germany were later replaced by fixed stations, the "heavies".

After the end of the war in Europe, Britain planned to send Lancasters to the Japanese theatre as part of Tiger Force and to use Gee for the passage of flights to Asia. Preparations began for Gee transmitters in Nablus (in Palestine) guiding the flights across the Middle East, but the surrender of Japan removed the need for this chain. This work was being carried out by MEDME, Cairo, under Air Vice-Marshal R. S. Aitken.

German bombers also used the Gee system for attacks on the UK; captured Gee receivers provided the electronics.

=== Gee-H ===
Later in the war, Bomber Command wanted to deploy a new navigation system not for location fixing, but to mark a single spot in the air. This location would be used to drop bombs or target indicators for strikes by other bombers. The Oboe system provided this already; Oboe sent an interrogation signal from stations in the UK, "reflected" them from transceivers on the aircraft, and timed the difference between the two signals using equipment similar to Gee. However, Oboe had the major limitation that it could only guide a single aircraft at a time and took about 10 minutes to guide a single aircraft to its target. A system able to guide more aircraft at once would be a dramatic improvement.

The result was a new version of the same basic Oboe concept, but reversed so that it was driven by the aircraft and reflected from ground-based transceivers. This would require equipment on the aircraft that could receive and measure the time difference between two signals. The reuse of the existing Gee equipment for this purpose was obvious. The new Gee-H system only required a single modification, the addition of a new transmitter that would send signals out for reflection from ground-based transceivers. With this transmitter turned off, the system reverted to being a normal Gee unit. This allowed it to be used in Gee-H mode during attacks, and then Gee mode for navigation back to their home airfields.

=== Postwar use ===
Gee was of such great utility that the hurried deployments during the war were rationalized as the basis for an ongoing and growing navigational system. The result was a set of four chains, South Western, Southern, Scottish, and Northern, which have continuous coverage over most of the UK out to the northeastern corner of Scotland. These were joined by a further two chains in France, and a single chain in the UK occupation zone in northern Germany.

== Technical details ==
=== Basic concept ===
A single leg of a Gee chain lies along the "baseline" from stations A to B. At any point between these stations, a receiver will measure a difference in timing of the two pulses. This same delay will occur in many other locations along a hyperbolic curve. A navigational chart showing a sample of these curves produces a graph like this image.

Hyperbolic navigation systems can be divided into two main classes: those that calculate the time difference between two radio pulses, and those that compare the phase difference between two continuous signals. Here, only the pulse method is considered.

Consider two radio transmitters located at a distance of 300 km from each other, which means the radio signal from one will take 1 millisecond to reach the other. One of these stations is equipped with an electronic clock that periodically sends out a trigger signal. When the signal is sent, this station, A, sends out its transmission. A millisecond later, that signal arrives at the second station, B. This station is equipped with a receiver, and when it sees the signal from A arrive, it triggers its own transmitter. This ensures that stations send out signals precisely 1 ms apart, without the second station needing to have an accurate timer of its own. In practice, a fixed time is added to account for delays in the electronics.

A receiver listening for these signals and displaying them on an oscilloscope sees a series of blips on the display. By measuring the distance between them, the delay between the two signals can be calculated. For instance, a receiver might measure the distance between the two blips to represent a delay of 0.5 ms. This implies that the difference in the distance to the two stations is 150 km. In this case, an infinite number of locations exist where that delay could be measured – 75 km from one station and 225 from the other, or 150 km from one and 300 from the other, and so on.

When plotted on a chart, the collection of possible locations for any given time difference forms a hyperbolic curve. The collection of curves for all possible measured delays forms a set of curved radiating lines, centred on the line between the two stations, known as the "baseline". To take a fix, the receiver takes two measurements based on two different pairs of stations. The intersections of the two sets of curves normally results in two possible locations, equal distance on either side of the midpoint of the baseline. Using some other form of navigation, dead reckoning for instance, one can eliminate one of these possible positions, thus providing an exact fix.

Instead of using two separate pairs of stations, the system can be simplified by having a single master and two secondaries located some distance away from each other so their patterns overlap. A collection of such stations is known as a "chain".

=== Gee chains ===
Gee chains used an arrangement with one master and two or three secondaries. The transmitters had a power output around 300 kW and operated in four frequency bands between 20 and 85 MHz.

The Gee signal for any given chain consisted of a series of pulses of radio signal with a roughly inverted-parabolic envelope about 6 microseconds in duration. In a three station system, the master sent a single pulse, referred to as A, followed 2 milliseconds (ms) later by a double pulse, A′ (A Prime). The first secondary sent a single pulse 1 ms after the master's single pulse, labeled B, and the second sent a single pulse 1 ms after the master's double pulse, labeled C. As the receiver did not have any means of automatically synchronizing to the master signal, the A′ double pulse allowed the order sequence to be identified by the navigator operating the receiver. The whole sequence repeated on a 4 ms cycle (i.e. 250 times per second), with the pattern A-B-A′-C. In the case of a four station system, the cycle above would be repeated, with the addition of the D station, which would broadcast another double pulse. To allow this to be identified, the D station was timed at 166 times per second, such that its pulse would move from the A-B trace to the A'-C trace, not appearing on either trace and back to the A-B trace. The cycle therefore was A-B-D-A′-C-A-B-A′-C-D-A-B-A′-C.... The D pulse appearing on both traces meant that a fix could be made using the combinations AB/AC, AB/AD, or AC/AD, giving a wider area of high precision coverage than the three station system.

The triggering of the A pulses was timed at 150 kHz by a stable local oscillator at the master station, but the timing was sometimes deliberately changed. The time for ten cycles of this 150 kHz oscillation, 66.66 μs, was called a Gee unit and corresponded to a range difference of 12.4 miles (20.0 km).

=== Decoding the signals ===
On board the aircraft, the signals from the three or four stations were received and sent to the display. The description below is with reference to a three station system, but the D pulse would be substituted for either the B or C pulse in a four station system.

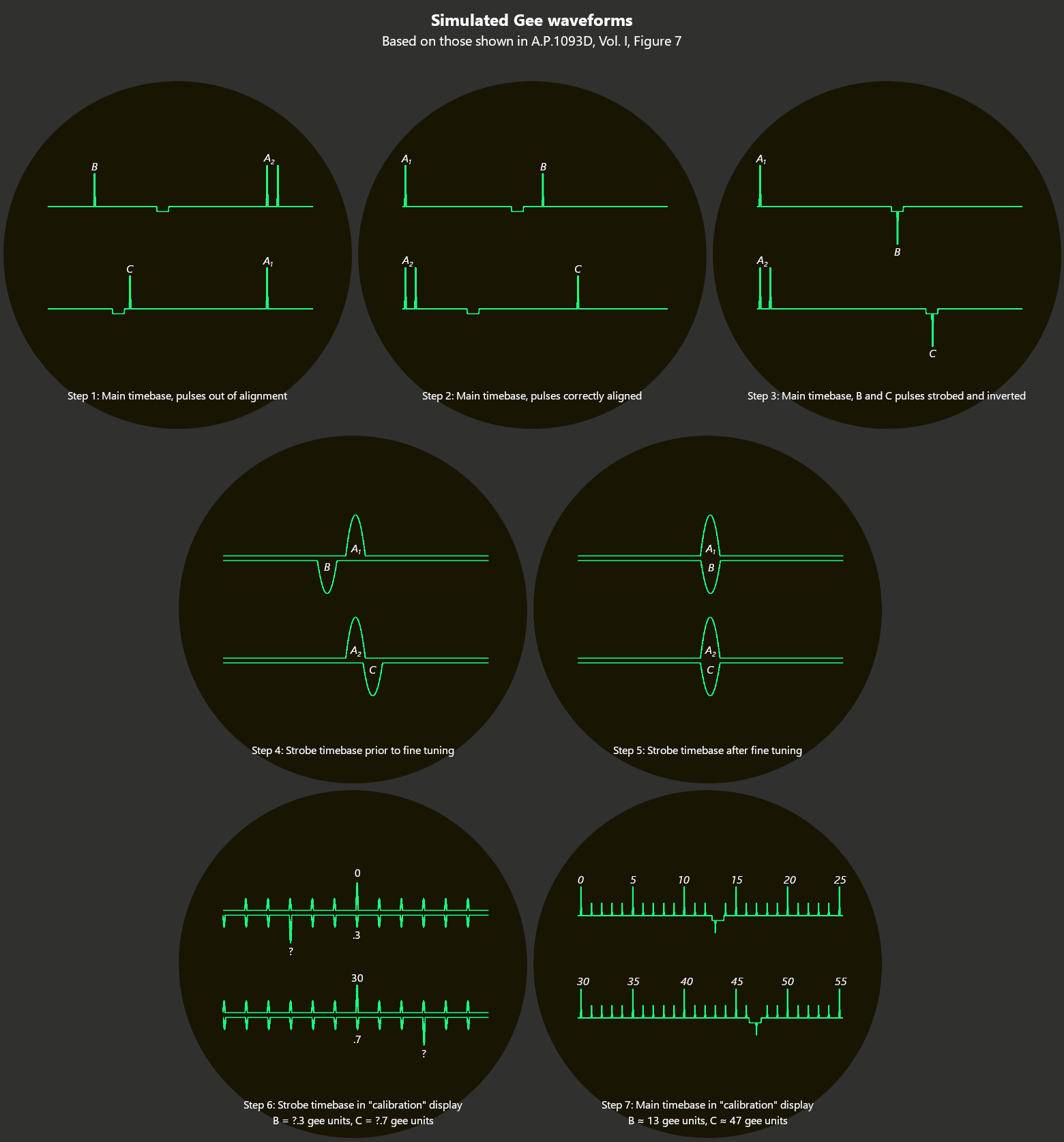
Simulated Gee navigation indicator waveforms

In the "Main" time base setting, the CRT display was configured to display the signal across two lines, each showing half of the time of the signal. A local oscillator of much less complexity than the one at the master station was used to trigger the display sweep. When first activated, it would be unlikely to have exactly the same timing as the master station, so the operator would see the pattern of blips traveling across the screen. A control knob that adjusted the oscillator was used to tune the local oscillator frequency until the blips on the display were stationary which meant the local and master oscillators now had the same timing (simulated waveform "Step 1"). The pulses would be identified, then a delay control was adjusted to move the blips back and forth in order to bring the double A′ pulses to the left of the bottom trace, directly below the A on the upper trace (simulated waveform "Step 2").

Rotary switches followed by fine adjustment were used to position markers under the B and C pulses (the markers would invert the pulses on the display) (simulated waveform "Step 3"), and then the time base was switched to a "fast" position, which would add additional lines to the display, and show the A and A′ pulses above the inverted B and C pulses respectively (simulated waveform "Step 4"). The fine adjustment would be used to position the B pulse directly beneath the A pulse, and the C pulse directly beneath the A′ pulse (simulated waveform "Step 5"). A switch, referred to as the "clearing switch", was thrown, and the time of the fix noted. The clearing switch changed the display from displaying the pulses to displaying an internally generated scale. This scale would be read in the "fast" time base position for the decimal readings, followed by the whole numbers which would be read with the display in the "Main" time base setting (simulated waveforms "Step 6" and "Step 7"). The respective numbers from the A-B and A′-C readings would were then looked up on a Gee chart.

Signals from different chains were closely spaced in frequency, close enough that the wide-band R1355 receiver would often tune in more than one chain at a time. For station identification, the A′ signals were only sent periodically. After the display was stabilized so the pulse trains were appearing in a single location on the screen, the A′ pulses could be seen blinking on and off with a set pattern (thus "ghosting" on the display). This allowed the operator to determine the identity of the master signal, and thus select the chain they wanted to use by positioning its associated A′ signal on the bottom left.

=== Accuracy ===
At long ranges the hyperbolic lines approximate straight lines radiating from the center of the baseline. When two such signals from a single chain are considered, the resulting pattern of lines becomes increasingly parallel as the baseline distance becomes smaller in comparison to the range. Thus at short distances the lines cross at angles close to 90 degrees, and this angle steadily reduces with range. As the accuracy of the fix depends on the crossing angle, all hyperbolic navigation systems grow increasingly inaccurate with increasing range.

When examining the signal on the expanded display, timing was based on 1/10 of a Gee unit, or 6.66 μs. This corresponds to a distance of 1.24 miles (2,000 m). It was assumed that an operator under good conditions could measure the peaks of the pulse envelope within 1/10 of a calibration mark, or 0.124 miles (200 m). This is the basic accuracy of the Gee system, at least at shorter ranges and at locations near the center of the baselines where the hyperbolic lines were close to perpendicular. In practice, the accuracy was a function of range from the transmitters, varying roughly with the square of distance. At short ranges accuracies of 165 yards (151 m) were reported, while at long range over Germany it was quoted to about 1 mile (1.6 km).

=== Equipment ===
The airborne side of the Gee Mk. II system consisted of two portions, the R1355 radio receiver, and the Indicator Unit Type 62 (or 62A) oscilloscope. The two were connected by two thick cables, one of which carried the video signal, and the second carried the power to the Indicator, the power supply being built into the receiver to save space on the display side. A "tropicalized" version of the system was also produced, with the R3645 receiver and Indicator Unit Type 299, which moved the latter's power supply into the display unit.

The R1355 was designed so as to allow the Radio Frequency Unit (RFU) to be easily swapped over in flight. This allowed the navigator to select different Gee chains, the change-over operation taking only a minute or so. A change of RFU could also be used to avoid jamming, as the Germans would not know which chains were being actively used.

=== Gee-H use ===
In the case of Gee-H, the use of the system was changed only slightly. Instead of the sweep being timed by the local oscillator in the display unit, the trigger signal was instead sent from an onboard timer. The signal was also amplified and sent out to interrogate the distant ground stations, whose response signals were received on the existing Gee receiver. In theory, this could be used to calculate a fix in exactly the same fashion as with Gee, using different charts. However, navigating to a target using such a system would be complex; multiple fixes would have to be taken over time and then averaged in order to calculate the ground speed and direction.

Instead, Gee-H was used in a fashion similar to the earlier Oboe system. The navigator would first pick a station to be the "cat" signal, using it as the main navigation beacon. The range from the cat station to the target was measured, and then the signal delay that would be seen at that range was calculated. A timer in the unit was set to this delay, producing a separate A-like blip on the display at that fixed point. The received pulse from the "cat" station would also be displayed on the same trace. By instructing the pilot to turn left or right, the navigator would guide the bomber until the two traces were precisely overlapped, meaning that the bomber was flying a precise distance from the station. The pilot would then fly the aircraft along the circular arc that would take them over the aim point, with periodic corrections from the navigator as needed to realign the two blips. The signal received from the second station, "mouse", was likewise set up for display on the lower trace, but in this case, the distance would continue to change as the aircraft flew along the arc of the "cat" station. When this signal overlapped the pre-set range from "mouse", the payload was dropped.

Using this method of operation greatly reduced the workload for the navigator. For much of the mission, he simply had to keep the blips on the upper trace aligned on the display, and then periodically watch the lower blips for timing. Additionally, due to the measurements always being measured as direct lines from the station, as opposed to hyperbolic curves, the accuracy fell off linearly instead of with the square of distance. Gee-H could thus guide the bomber to within 120 yards over Germany, a dramatic improvement over Gee's approximately 1 mile accuracy at the same distance.

=== Advantages and disadvantages ===
Unlike the German beam systems where the bombers flew to their targets along the beam, Gee pulses were radiated in all directions so, if detected, they would not reveal the bombers' destinations. As the system was passive, unlike H2S, there were no return signals which could give away the bombers' positions to night fighters. Additionally, this meant all of the aircraft could use the system at the same time.

Gee was highly susceptible to jamming; all the Germans had to do was radiate spurious pulses that made it impossible to determine which was a real signal from the stations and which was being broadcast from a jammer. This could be easily arranged by locating a transmission station in France or the Netherlands and modifying its delay and signal strength for its signals to appear to be similar to those from one of the stations in the UK. This worked only over Germany; when aircraft were flying over the UK these signals would appear too weak. Using conventional radio receivers and loop antennas for direction finding, radio operators could determine which of the signals was false. Even if jammed over enemy territory, Gee had the extremely useful advantage of providing a reliable navigational fix once homeward aircraft were over the North Sea on return from operations, making it easier for returning bombers to find their airfields with a resultant reduction in losses due to accidents.

== Stations ==
=== World War II chains ===
Each chain had a code word using the names of American states, suggesting this was for the use of American aircraft.

Note: AMES is short for Air Ministry Experimental Station.

==== Eastern chain ====
Test work, including timing and signal strength, was undertaken at several places for much of 1941, with the 4 transmitter stations at Daventry (master), Ventnor, Stenigot and Clee Hill (slaves), and the monitoring station at Great Bromley running as an experimental chain from July.

The Eastern chain became operational (as opposed to conducting tests) from March 1942, and was used in "Bomber" Harris's major and unprecedentedly successful raids on Lübeck and Cologne that spring, Its HQ and monitoring station, initially at Great Bromley, moved on to Barkway that November. Wing Commander Phillips, assisted by Squadron Leader Allerston and the scientific side Edward Fennessey, were then in charge. (AVIA 7/1251, AIR 29/147 & other National Archive Files; Air Ministry Maps of Gt Bromley and Barkway sites at RAF Museum; J P Foynes "AMES 24:The Pylons at Great Bromley"). Fully operational 22 June 1942.

Virginia: 48.75 MHz

- Master, Daventry, Northamptonshire (SP590631)
- B Slave Station, Stenigot (TF257825)
- C Slave Station, Ventnor then Gibbet Hill, Hindhead, Surrey (SU899359)
- D Slave Station, Clee Hill, Shropshire (SO598779)
- Chain monitor, RAF Gt Bromley, Essex, then Barkway, near Royston, Hertfordshire. (TL380364)

==== Southern chain ====
Virginia: 48.75 MHz. Eastern and Southern (Virginia) chains could not operate simultaneously.

- Master, Bulbarrow Hill
- Truleigh Hill
- West Prawle

Carolina: 44.90 MHz. Used by Coastal Command and Combined Operations.

Same Master and Slave sites.

==== South-Eastern chain ====
Carolina: 44.90 MHz. Used by Combined Operations.

- Master, Truleigh Hill
- Canewdon

==== Northern chain ====
The Northern Gee chain operated from late 1942 until March 1946.

- Master, Burifa Hill on Dunnet Head, in Caithness, Scotland. (ND201755)
- Scousburgh, Shetland Islands (HU387187)
- Windyhead Hill, Pennan, Aberdeenshire (NJ854619)
- Sango, Durness, Sutherland (NC414677)
- Chain Monitor co-located at Burifa Hill

==== South Western Chain ====
- Master, Sharpitor (SX73)
- Worth Matravers (SY964778)
- Sennen (SW3625)
- Folly (SM858195)
- Chain Monitor, Trerew (SW812585)

Worth Matravers was used after the war as a training base for Gee operators.

- C Slave Brest. AMES 101 (a light Type 100) from 2 December 1944

==== North-Eastern chain ====
Operational 18 April 1944

- Master Station, Richmond, Yorkshire AMES 7711
- B Slave Station, High Whittle, Northumberland AMES 7721
- C Slave Station, Stenigot AMES 7722. Changed to Nettleton (formerly known as Caistor) because of poor coverage from Stenigot.

==== Western chain ====
A Western chain was planned but cancelled.

==== North Western chain ====
Operational for about six months in 1945.

Planned:

- Master Station, Mull AMES 7411 (Site unknown)
- B Slave Station, Saligo Bay AMES 7421
- C Slave Station, Barra AMES 7422 (Site unknown)
- D Slave Station, Down Hill (Northern Ireland) AMES 7423

Operational:

- Master Station, Saligo Bay
- B Slave Station, Down Hill (Northern Ireland)
- C Slave Station, Kilkenneth, Tiree

==== Others ====
In 1945 after VE day, it was planned to redeploy large numbers of Lancaster Bombers to Asia to support the war against Japan, and to help guide the Bombers during the transfer, Gee chains were in process of being set up under the guidance of Air Vice-Marshal Max Aitken. This work ceased once the Atomic bombs were dropped. A station was being set up in Nablus, in Palestine, under the control of RAF MedME in Cairo.

There was another chain Indiana using 46.79 MHz but it was not in use by 1943.

An emergency frequency (XF) of 50.5 MHz, codeword Zanesville, was allocated.

=== Post D-Day chains in Europe ===
==== Channel Chain ====
- Master UK
- Slave UK
- C Slave Anneville-en-Saire, Cherbourg. Operational 23 August 1944. AMES 7921

==== Rheims Chain ====
Operational 5 October 1944. 83.5 MHz

- Master Rheims AMES 7912 became AMES 7913
- B Slave La Capelle AMES 7925 became AMES 105
- C Slave Ligny AMES 7926 became AMES 128
- D Slave Estissac AMES 7924 became AMES 124
- Monitor Mourmelon AMES 7931

==== Louvain / Ruhr Chain ====
Operational 9 October 1944, replaced by heavy mobile equipment 23 October 1944 and became the Ruhr Chain.

80.5 MHz (?)

- Master Louvain AMES 107 to be replaced by AMES 7911
- B Slave Eindhoven AMES 105 to be replaced by AMES 7923
- C Slave Laroche AMES 106 to be replaced by AMES 7922
- D Slave Axel AMES 108 to be replaced by AMES 7921

==== Saar Chain ====
Operational 21 March 1945 using light Type 100 units. Replaced with heavy units from the Rheims Chain. 50.5 MHz

- Master St Avold AMES 108 became AMES 7912 with AMES 108 as standby
- B Slave Diekirch AMES 106 became AMES 7925 with AMES 106 as standby
- C Slave Saverne AMES 104 became AMES 7225 with AMES 104 as standby
- D Slave Gondercourt

==== Metz / Munster Chain ====
- Master Commercy AMES 108
- B Slave Arlon AMES 106
- C Slave Remiremont AMES 104

==== Frankfurt Chain ====
- Master Roermond AMES 7932 later AMES 7911
- B Slave Nijmegen AMES 120 later AMES 7923
- C Slave Euskirchen AMES 102 later AMES 7922 (AMES 102 was the first 72 Wing unit deployed in Germany)
- D Slave Louvain AMES 129 later AMES 7921

==== Innsbruck / Nurnberg Chain ====
Planned but decided that no longer needed though decided to go ahead as part of the post-war Gee organisation. Operational 26 April 1945.

==== Kassel / Central German Chain ====
- Master Winterberg AMES 7932
- B Slave Osnabruck AMES 120
- C Slave Gotha AMES 102
- D Slave Bad Homberg AMES 131

==== Munich Chain ====
Proposed:

- Master Bad Homberg AMES 108
- B Slave Fulda AMES 106
- C Slave Neustadt AMES 104
- D Slave Kempenich AMES 127

Deployed as:

- Master Hesselburg AMES 7912
- B Slave Zinzenzell AMES 7925
- C Slave Munsingen AMES 7926
- D Slave Fulda AMES 7921

=== Post-World War II chains ===
After World War II the Gee system was used as a navigational aid for civil aviation though mainly from new sites.

=== English Chains ===
Post-World War II the RAF re-sited two of the three wartime Gee chains in England. Eastern and South Western chains (four stations each) and Southern chain of three stations. The Southern chain became a four station London chain and Eastern chain became a Midland chain. This was planned for 1948.

==== Northern Chain ====
This continued post-World War II using existing sites, two on the North coast of Scotland, one North of Aberdeen and one in Shetland.

==== Scottish Chain ====
Opened around 1948 and closed early 1969.

Master Station: Lowther Hill

Slave Stations:

- Great Dun Fell, Cumberland
- Craigowl Hill, near Dundee
- Rhu Stafnish, near Campbeltown

==== Other chains ====
A chain of Gee stations was opened after the war in North Germany. Stations were at Winterberg, Bad Iburg, Nordhorn and Uchte.

There were several stations during the 1955–59 period that appeared to be more of a deception than really operational. They were 550 SU at Fort Spijkerboor outside of Purmerend, Holland; 889 SU at Eckernförde in North Germany; and 330 SU outside of Ingolstadt in Bavaria, Germany. These stations were rarely if ever operational in the late 1950s. 330Su was an amalgamation of 3 units 330. 259 and 953 signals units and was in continuous operation at Ingolstadt from May 1958 to September 1961. The other 2 units forming this chain were at Oberkirchen and Schleswig. All three had particular attractions: Ingolstadt had access to the main US Army PX in Munich. Oberkirchen was close to the NAAFI winter sports center and Schleswig was on the dunes by the nude bathing area.
