= Target indicator =

Flare marking a bombing target in WWII

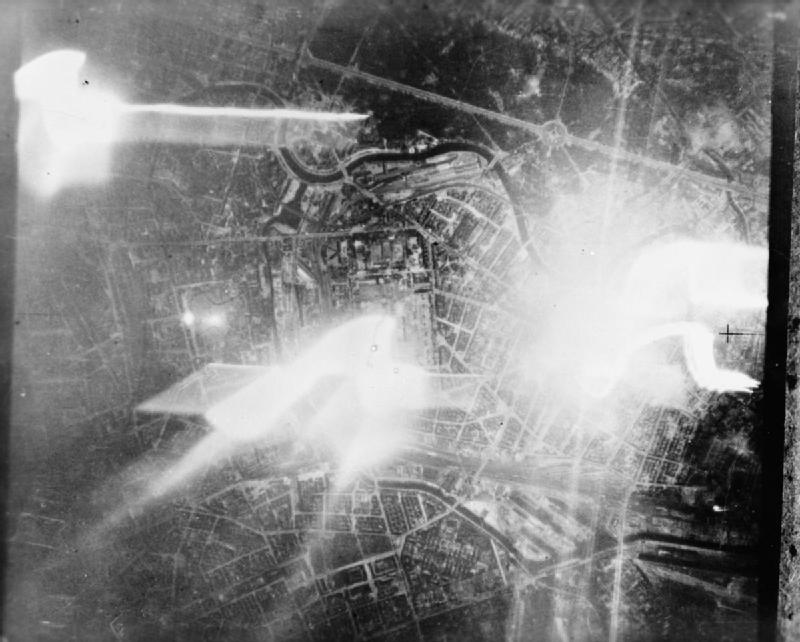
Target indicators falling over Berlin during a raid on the city

Target indicators, also known as target markers or TI's for short, were flares used by the RAF's Bomber Command during World War II. TIs were normally dropped by Pathfinders onto the target, providing an easily seen visual aiming point for the following "main force" of bombers to aim at. After their introduction, the use of TIs expanded to include en-route markers to gather up lost aircraft, additional TI drops to keep the target lit over long periods, and various changes in technique to address German defences.

The use of TIs allowed the RAF to concentrate its advanced navigational systems in the Pathfinder units. Most widely used were the H2S ground scanning radar and Oboe navigation system, the former requiring considerable training to be useful, the latter able to guide only a single aircraft at a time. The limited number of navigational units meant that spreading them through the force would have limited effects. By concentrating these in a single Group (No. 8 Group RAF) and having them drop TIs, the accurate fixes could be used to guide the entire attack. The same basic system had been used by the Luftwaffe's Kampfgruppe 100 during The Blitz, for similar reasons.

Target indicators were available in various colours, some with ejecting stars of the same or a different colour. During a raid, bomb aimers would be instructed by the Master Bomber to drop their bombs on the target indicators of a specified colour, the marker aircraft carrying different colours to be used if the initial target indicators were dropped off-target. The first target indicators could be cancelled over the radio by the Master Bomber and the marker crews instructed to drop new target indicators of a different colour, until the correct aiming point was correctly marked. The Main Force bombers would then be instructed by the Master Bomber to bomb the colour of the most accurate target indicators.

Target indicators could be fuzed for both air and ground burst, the air burst markers – referred to as "sky marking" by the RAF – resembling bunches of grapes or upturned fir trees when detonated in the air under their parachutes. The Germans called these "Christmas trees" because of their shape.

Marking of targets was carried out using the following methods:

- "Newhaven" – target marking blind using H2S, then with visual backup marking
- "Parramatta" – target marking by blind-dropped ground markers, prefixed with "Musical" when the bombers were guided by Oboe
- "Wanganui" – target marking by blind-dropped sky markers when ground concealed by cloud, prefixed with "Musical" when Oboe-guided

The three code words were initially chosen by asking three Bomber Command personnel in the operations room where they came from. One was from Newhaven, England, one from Parramatta, Australia, and one from Wanganui, New Zealand.

Oboe was usually carried by Pathfinder de Havilland Mosquitoes.

== History ==
The first TIs were converted 4,000 lb (1,800 kg) "cookie" bomb casings filled with red pyrotechnic, benzole, rubber and phosphorus. These were nicknamed "pink pansies" and were used for the first time on the night of 10/11 September 1942 against Düsseldorf.

== Bibliography ==
- Bennett, Donald C T, Air Vice-Marshall (1972). Pathfinder. London: Sphere Books.
- Bowman, Martin W. (2016). Voices in Flight: The Path Finder Force. Pen and Sword. ISBN 978-1-4738-8116-7.
- Neillands, Robin (2002). The Bomber War; Arthur Harris and the Allied Bomber Offensive 1939–1945. London: John Murray. ISBN 0-7195-5644-9.
- "Part I — Chapter 18 Target Identification Bombs", OP1665 British Explosive Ordnance (1970 ed.), US Navy Bureau of Ordnance, June 1946, pp. 127–141
