= Oboe (navigation) =

British bomb aiming system

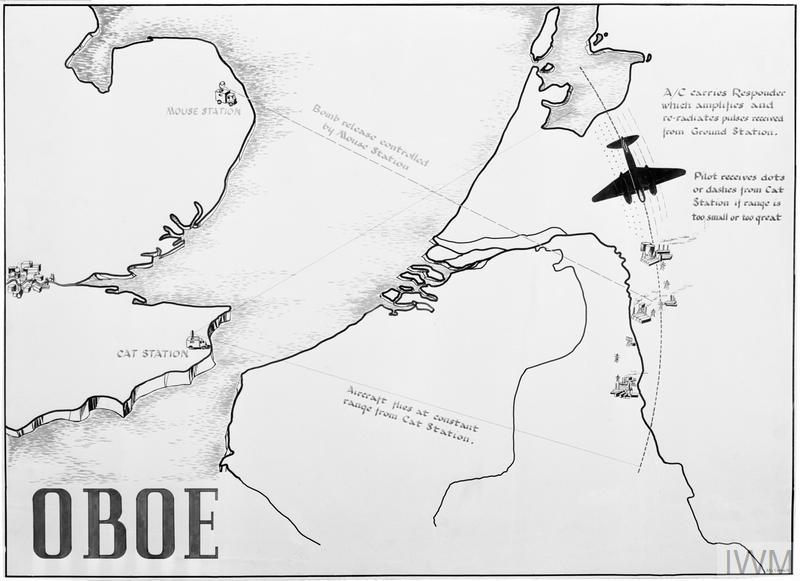
An illustration of Oboe. Two radar stations track the flight of the aircraft. The southern station is the Cat which generates pulses whose arc is defined by the distance from the station to the target. The aircraft will fly along the arc from a start point ten minutes flight from the target. As it approaches the intersect with the arc from the Mouse station the aircraft is signaled to prepare for bomb release. When the aircraft reaches the point where the two arcs intersect the Mouse station transmits the signal to release bombs.

Oboe was a British bomb aiming system developed to allow their aircraft to bomb targets accurately in any type of weather, day or night. Oboe coupled radar tracking with radio transponder technology. The guidance system used two well-separated radar stations to track the aircraft. Two circles were created before the mission, one around each station, such that they intersected at the bomb drop point. The operators used the radars, aided by transponders on the aircraft, to guide the bomber along one of the two circles and drop the bombs when they reached the intersection.

The system was developed in 1942 by the Telecommunications Research Establishment at Malvern in Worcestershire, working in close association with 109 Squadron. By December 1942 a working system had been developed. The first major use of Oboe was in March 1943 when the system was used to mark the Krupp Works in an attack against Essen. Over the course of the month the system was used with great success to mark targets for the Main Force against the German industrial center of the Ruhr and for attacks against Cologne. Through November 1943 Oboe was used with good success against targets within its 250-mile (400 km) range.

In December 1943 Bomber Command entered what was hoped to be a war winning campaign with the Battle of Berlin. Berlin was over the horizon for even the highest flying RAF aircraft, and thus beyond the range of Oboe. The campaign had to depend upon straight navigation and H2S. Bomber Command's efforts against Berlin over the next four months were unsuccessful. At the end of March Bomber Command was directed to serve under SHAEF to make preparations for the invasion of occupied Europe. These missions to northern France allowed Oboe to again demonstrate its value in the precision delivery of markers or bombs, regardless of weather or the visibility of the target.

Neither H2S nor Gee-H could provide the accuracy of Oboe. By guidance direction of individual aircraft, Oboe was used both to guide marker aircraft for the Main Force and for bombing aircraft making precision bombings of high value targets. It was by far the most accurate bombing system used during the war.

== History ==
=== Background ===
In order to accurately determine one's location relative to objects on the ground one needs two data points; two angles (as in triangulation), two distances (trilateration), or an angle and a distance (VOR/DME). Using radio to provide some or all of these measurements was an area of continual development leading up to the start of the war. The Germans pioneered this approach with operational systems like Lorenz beam and X-Gerät that used two narrow beam-like signals that crossed at a point in the sky to indicate a target using triangulation. Later, during The Blitz, the Germans introduced Y-Gerät, which combined a single Lorenz beam with a transponder-based distance measurement to fix locations. The problem with all of these systems was that they produced no information except within their narrow beams, and were not useful for general purpose navigation.

A more useful system was introduced in the RAF's Gee system, which used two timed signals that allowed the navigator on the bomber to determine their location using trilateration. It could be used anywhere within line-of-sight of the transmitter stations in the UK, and generally provided a reasonable signal up to about 500 kilometres (310 mi), depending on the aircraft's altitude. Gee was read on an oscilloscope display about 3 inches (76 mm) across, which limited the accuracy of the timing measurements. As a result, Gee was accurate on the order of kilometers, which was extremely useful for navigation and area bombing, but did not provide the accuracy needed for pinpoint bombing.

As the accuracy of Gee was largely relative to the mechanical size of the indicator unit, the accuracy could be improved by using a larger display. However, in these early days of the cathode-ray tube (CRT), such displays were extremely expensive and very long, which made them unsuitable for fitting to a large number of Bomber Command aircraft.

=== Initial proposal ===
The concept of reversing the display arrangement so the display could be on the ground and the transmitter on the aircraft was obvious. It had first been suggested by Alec Reeves of Standard Telephones and Cables in 1940 and then formally presented with the help of Francis Jones in the spring of 1941.

The basic idea would be to have two ground stations that would periodically send out signals on similar but separate frequencies. The aircraft carried transponders, one for each signal, which re-broadcast the signals upon reception. By timing the total round trip time from broadcast to reception and then dividing by twice the speed of light (the signal travels to the aircraft and back again) the distance to the aircraft could be determined. This was essentially identical to radar, with the exception that the transponder greatly amplified the signals for the return journey, which aided accuracy by providing strong, sharply defined signal pulses.

A practical problem was using these range measurements to guide a bomber towards its target. In the case of Y-Gerät, a single beam was used that produced a natural path for the bomber to fly along. Only the range along this path needed to be measured and relayed to the bomber crew. In the case of a system using two range measurements, there was no inherent path in the sky for the aircraft to follow. Locations and directions could be determined by the phoning the two range measurements to a plotting room, drawing arcs from the stations at those measured distances, and then locating the intersection. However, this took time, during which the aircraft moved, making it too slow to provide the desired accuracy.

Oboe adopted a simple solution to this problem. Before the mission, a path was defined that represented the arc of a circle whose radius passed through the target as measured from one of the two stations. This station was given the name "Cat". The aircraft would then use conventional navigation techniques, dead reckoning or Gee if it was equipped, to place itself some distance north or south of the target on a point near this line. They would then begin flying towards the target, at which point an operator at Cat would call out corrections to have the aircraft fly closer or further from the station until it was flying at precisely the right range to keep it on the circle.

The Cat station continued to keep the aircraft positioned at this precise distance as it flew towards the target, causing the aircraft to fly along the pre-defined arc. The second station, code-named "Mouse", also calculated the range to the target before the mission. As the bomber approached that predetermined range they would first call out a "heads up" to tell the bomb aimer to begin the run, and then a second signal at the right time to drop it. Using this method there was no need for the two stations to compare measurements or perform any trigonometry to determine an actual location in space, both performed simple range measurements directly off their screen and sent their separate corrections to the aircraft.

In practice, ranges were not sent by voice to the aircraft. Instead, a tone generator produced Morse code dots or dashes under the control of the operators. This was similar to the beam systems like Lorenz, which the UK aircrew were already familiar with using as a blind landing aid in the pre-war period. If the aircraft was too close to the station the operator would play the dot signal, and when they were too far, dashes. The two could be mixed so that as they approached the correct range, the dots would fill in the gaps between the dashes and form a steady tone.

Periodically the signal would be keyed to send out a letter to indicate how far they were from the correct range, X indicating 20 miles (32 km), Y 10 miles (16 km), and Z 5 miles (8.0 km). Likewise, the Mouse station sent a series of keyed signals to indicate the approach, S to indicate the approach was starting, and then A, B, C and D as the aircraft approached.

=== Development and testing ===
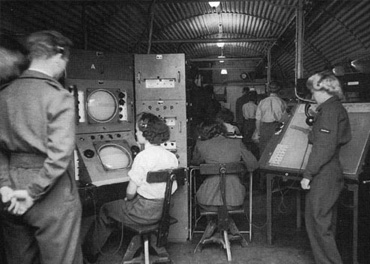
The left side of this image shows an Oboe navigation console. The two CRTs, some of the largest built during that era, were used for gross and fine distance measurement. This control room is built into a Nissen hut (or similar) which may suggest it is one of the mobile sites moved to continental Europe after D-Day.

There were some obvious problems with this approach, however. One of the most obvious is that any given ground station could only track a single aircraft at a time, compared to Gee where any bomber could pick up the signals from the UK and carry out the necessary calculations. This did not immediately eliminate it as a useful system; Y-Gerät had the same limitation, so it was used for target marking by flying one aircraft under control and having it drop flares for the following aircraft to drop on. The British adopted the same solution.

A more worrying concern was that the bomber aircraft would have to fly straight and level along a gently curving path while the ground station monitored its range as it flew towards the target. During this time the aircraft would be open to attack, which some considered to be almost suicidal. Lastly, the British had no difficulty jamming the German Y-Gerät system, even before it was widely used. There was no reason to expect the Germans would not do the same with Oboe as soon as they detected the signals.

Despite widespread opposition to the use of Oboe, A. P. Rowe ordered development to begin. Development began both on the 1.5-metre wavelength (200 MHz) shared by most early UK radar systems, but also at the new "fashionable" 10-centimetre microwave wavelength (3.0 GHz) provided by the cavity magnetron. The latter would not only provide higher accuracy, but also be largely immune to jamming unless the Germans developed their own high-power microwave devices. This only occurred in the very last days of the war.

Two stations were set up as far east as possible, one in Dover (Walmer) and a second in Cromer (RAF Trimingham). On any given mission, one of the stations would be Cat and the other Mouse. In early testing in September 1941, an aircraft flying along the arc 130 kilometres (81 mi; 70 nmi) from Dover demonstrated an accuracy of 50 metres (160 ft), better than any bombing method then in use. Accuracy with bombs was not quite as good, as the bombs themselves were not identical and had slightly different trajectories. In a demonstration for senior officials on 2 July 1942, the system demonstrated a real-world accuracy of 65 metres (210 ft). In contrast, even using advanced visual bombsights like the Norden, average accuracies in 1942 were on the order of 1,500 yards (1,400 m).

Oboe was first used in experimental operations by Short Stirling heavy bombers in December 1941, attacking Brest. These aircraft had a relatively limited service ceiling, and was limited to attacks at short-range where they maintained line-of-sight to the UK.

At that time there was a great debate taking place in Bomber Command over the use of "pathfinders", specialized aircraft and crews that would find the targets and use flares to mark them for attack. The same technique had first been used during the Blitz by the Germans, notably by the specialist Kampfgruppe 100, but its effectiveness had been severely curtailed by British jamming efforts. Nevertheless, the concept had enough backing that a small force of Mosquitoes had been organized to operate as a pathfinder force, using normal optical sighting. This proved disappointing in practice, offering only a slight improvement in accuracy.

But the Mosquitoes were also the only aircraft that had the performance to fly at altitudes at which the Oboe signals could be received over Germany. At a meeting in the summer of 1942, it was agreed that the pathfinder Mosquitoes would be equipped with Oboe. Having faced opposition before, the addition of Oboe upset the argument against the specialist role, and what would become Pathfinder Force began forming over the ongoing objections.

=== Into service ===
The first experiments with Oboe in a combat setting over Germany began on the night of 20/21 December 1942, when a small force of six Oboe-equipped Mosquitoes were sent to bomb a power station at Lutterade in the Netherlands, on the German border. Three of the sets failed, but the three remaining aircraft, led by Squadron Leader Harry Emlyn Bufton, were able to drop properly. A follow-up reconnaissance mission the next day showed that nine of the bomb craters could be identified, all of them clustered closely together but some 2 kilometres (1.2 mi) away from the target. Similar tests with small numbers of Oboe aircraft, sometimes dropping flares for small numbers of Avro Lancasters following them, were made throughout December and January.

At first, the Germans wrote off these small attacks as nuisance raids, intended to upset production by sending the workers to the air raid shelters. However, it was soon realized that something very odd was occurring; aircraft were dropping only 6 to 10 bombs, often through heavy cloud cover, and having 80 to 90% of them hit their targets, normally blast furnaces or power stations. As part of this process, the bombers released photoflash flares, which lit up the ground below the aircraft enough for photography. On 7 January 1943, Hauptmann Alexander Dahl noted these and suggested that they were using the photographs to correct for measurement errors of a new bombing system.

This was precisely what had been happening. Over the UK Oboe demonstrated accuracy on the order of tens of metres, but over the Continent the early tests always produced worse results. But it was soon clear there was a pattern to the misses, which was surmised to be due to differences in the surveying grids used on the continent. The solution to this problem was provided by the Germans themselves; before the war they had made an effort to calibrate the two systems in a series of cross-Channel measurements that the UK Ordnance Survey also received. Using these corrections they were able to address the inaccuracies almost immediately.

By the late spring Bomber Command crews had practised the bomb-on-marker technique enough to begin major operations. Harris then began a series of raids known as the Battle of the Ruhr, opening with a raid on Essen on 5 March that produced rather poor results in spite of proper marking. The next major raid against the Krupp factory in Essen on 12/13 March was somewhat more successful, followed by a mix of raids that met with very different results. By May, however, the technique was tuned and a series of very large raids, typically with 500 to 800 bombers, demonstrated increasingly successful results. Among these was a late-May raid on Dortmund that caused the Hoesch steelworks to cease production, and a late July raid on Krupps that Goebbels stated had caused "complete stoppage of production in the Krupps works". Analysis of the results demonstrated that the number of bombs that fell on their targets doubled from the pre-Oboe era.

=== German countermeasures ===
Oboe missions were clearly identifiable to German radar operators; the aircraft would start some distance north or south of the target and then approach it on an arcing path they referred to as "Boomerang". Although the operators quickly became accustomed to these aircraft, actually arranging an interception of the high-flying and high-speed aircraft proved extremely difficult.

It took the Germans more than a year to decipher the operation of the system, led by the engineer H. Widdra, who had detected the British "Pip-squeak" Identification friend or foe [IFF] system in 1940. The first attempt to jam Oboe took place at the end of August 1943 during an attack on the Bochumer Verein steelworks in Essen. A system set up at the Maibaum tracking station in Kettwig broadcast false dot and dash signals on the 1.5 m band, hoping to make it impossible for the pilot to figure out if they were at the right position. This was the same technique that the British had used against German systems during The Blitz.

Unknown to the Germans, the Oboe system had already moved to the microwave-frequency 10 cm (3 GHz) Oboe Mark II, but the British kept broadcasting the older signals as a ruse. The failure to jam Oboe remained a mystery until July 1944, when the older signal was incorrectly set to mark one target while a pathfinder perfectly marked another. The Germans quickly surmised that there was another signal or system in use. The Germans were well acquainted with the British microwave systems in the 10 cm area, but in April 1944 the RAF had already introduced Oboe Mark III, which resisted German jamming efforts. Mark III also allowed up to four aircraft to use a set of frequencies (stations) and allowed different styles of approach, not just the arc.

=== Late war use ===
By this point the Battle of the Ruhr was long over and the majority of the RAF's bombing efforts concentrated on targets that were too far into Germany to be visible to Oboe. H2S took on the primary role in this era. The D-Day invasions and subsequent breakout allowed this to be addressed by setting up new Oboe stations on the continent.

Late in the war, Oboe was used to assist food drops to the Dutch still trapped under German occupation, as part of Operation Manna. Drop points were arranged with the Dutch Resistance and the food canisters were dropped within about 30 m (98 ft) of the aiming point using Oboe.

== Technical details ==
Oboe used two stations at well-separated locations in England to transmit a signal to a Mosquito Pathfinder bomber carrying a radio transponder. The transponder re-transmitted the signals, which were then received by the two stations. The round-trip time of each signal gave the distance to the bomber.

Each Oboe station used radio ranging to define a circle of specific radius. The intersection of the two circles pinpointed the target. The Mosquito flew along the circumference of the circle defined by one station, known as the "Cat", and dropped its load (either bombs or marking flares, depending on the mission) when it reached the intersection with the circle defined by another station, known as "Mouse". There was a network of Oboe stations over southern England and any of the stations could be operated as a Cat or a Mouse.

The Mark I Oboe was derived from Chain Home Low technology, operating at upper-range VHF frequencies of 200 MHz (1.5 metres). The two stations emitted a series of pulses at a rate of about 133 per second. The pulse width could be made short or long so it was received by the aircraft as a Morse code dot or dash. The Cat station sent continuous dots if the aircraft was too close and continuous dashes if the aircraft was too far and from these the pilot could make course corrections. (The Germans used a similar method with Knickebein.)

Various Morse letters could also be sent; for example, to notify an aircrew that their Mosquito was within a range of the target. The Mouse station sent five dots and a dash to indicate bomb release. The Mouse station included a bombsight computer, known as "Micestro", to determine the proper release time; there was no particular logic in carrying the bombsight on the Mosquito when it was under the control of the ground station.

Although Oboe had been tested against Essen in January 1943, Oboe was rarely used for "big industrial plants" such as those in the Ruhr Area. The basic idea of Oboe came from Alec Reeves of Standard Telephones and Cables Ltd, implemented in a partnership with Frank Jones of the Telecommunications Research Establishment (TRE); also part of the team was Dr Denis Stops, who later became a leading physicist at University College London. Denis Stops' role in the development of Oboe was so secret that he was drafted into the RAF Pathfinder Squadron as a Wing Commander to conduct his work. His role was largely to develop the systems on the aircraft in conjunction with the land-based radar systems. The system worked by using triangulation to pin-point the target. Dr. Stops once said that one unexpected spin-off of the system was that the Germans often did not know what the British were planning to bomb.

== Similar systems ==
The Germans improvised a system conceptually similar to Oboe, code named Egon, for bombing on the Eastern Front on a limited scale. It used two modified Freyas to play the roles of Cat and Mouse; these two Freya Egon sets were located about 93 miles (150 km) apart and the aircraft carried a two-channel IFF to respond to them. A director at each of the stations would provide course correction directions to the pilot by radio transmission. Though the Germans put considerable effort into other electronic navigation systems, they never developed this concept further.

Oboe had one major limitation: it could only be used by one aircraft at a time. To address this, the British came up with a new guidance scheme using the same elements, but mounting the transmitter in the aircraft and placing the transponders in the ground stations. More than one aircraft could use the two stations because random noise was inserted into the timing of each aircraft's transmitter pulse output. The receiving gear on the aircraft could match its own unique pulse pattern with that sent back by the transponders. Each receive–reply cycle took the transponder 100 microseconds, allowing it to handle a maximum of 10,000 interrogations per second and making "collisions" unlikely. The practical limit was about 80 aircraft under guidance of two stations at one time. This new scheme was called "GEE-H" (or "G-H")

The name "GEE-H" can be confusing, as the scheme was a modification upon Oboe. The name was adopted because the system was based on GEE technologies, operating on the same waveband of 15 to 3.5 metres / 20 to 85 MHz, and initially used the GEE display and calibrator. The "H" suffix came from the system using the twin-range or 'H' principle of measuring the range from transponders at two ground stations. It was nearly as accurate as Oboe itself.

== In popular culture ==
Oboe appears as a plot point in the "Lost Sheep" episode of the BBC television series Secret Army, which featured the search for a downed airman with technical knowledge of the system.

== See also ==
- List of World War II electronic warfare equipment
