= Philip Woodward =

British mathematician (1919–2018)

Philip M. Woodward
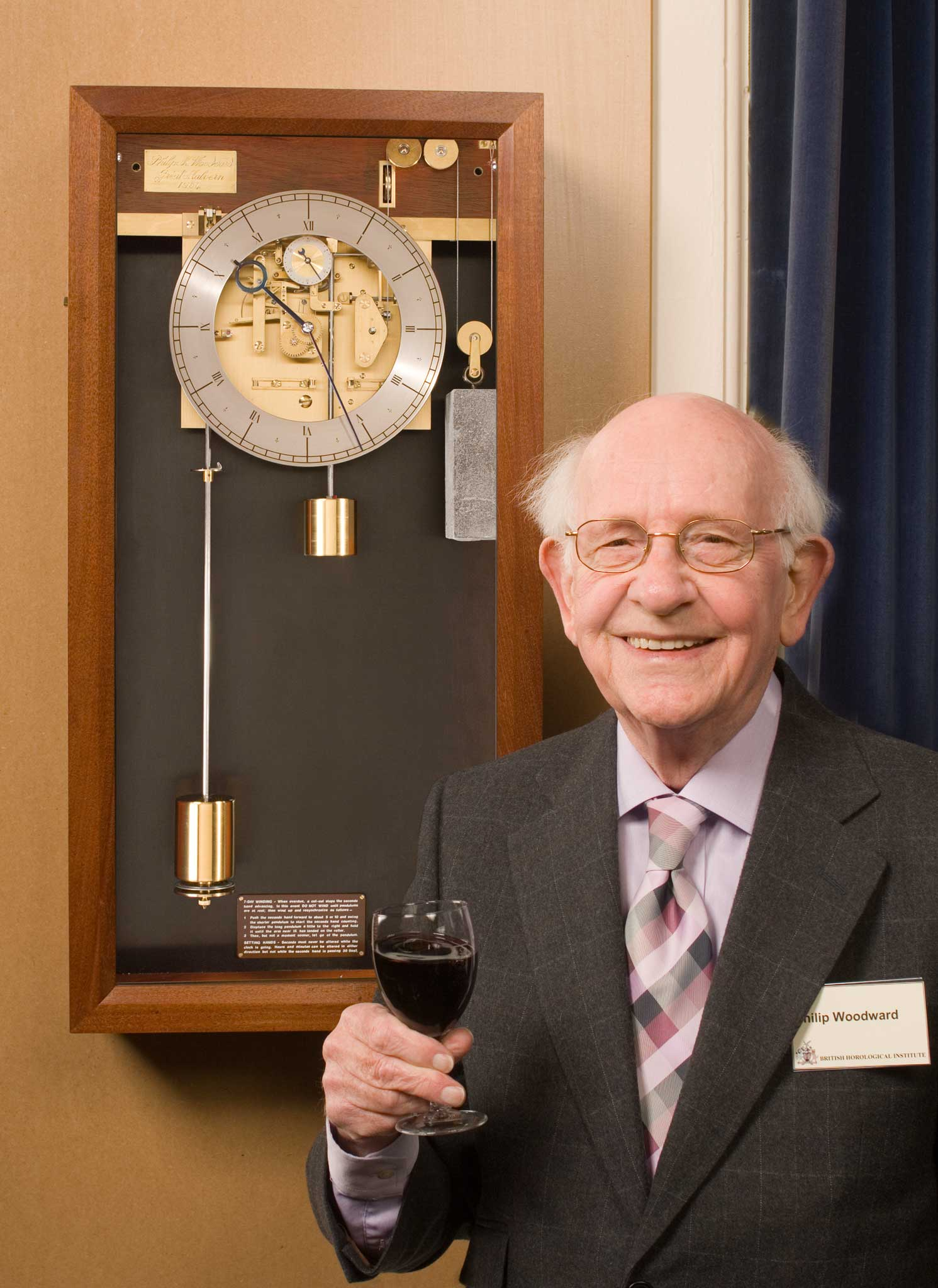
- Woodward with W5 at the British Horological Institute
- Born: 6 September 1919
- Died: 30 January 2018 (aged 98)
- Education: Oxford University
- Known for: Ambiguity function, sinc function, rect function, comb operator, rep operator, ALGOL 68-R
- Awards: Lifetime achievement award of the Royal Academy of Engineering (2005); IEEE Dennis J. Picard Medal for Radar Technologies and Applications (2009); Tompion medal of the Worshipful Company of Clockmakers (2009)
- Scientific career
- Fields: Signal processing, computing, horology
- Workplaces: Telecommunications Research Establishment, Royal Signals and Radar Establishment

Philip Mayne Woodward (6 September 1919 – 30 January 2018) was a British mathematician, radar engineer and horologist. He achieved notable success in all three fields. Before retiring, he was a deputy chief scientific officer at the Royal Signals and Radar Establishment of the British Ministry of Defence in Malvern, Worcestershire.

== Achievements in mathematics and engineering ==
Woodward's career in the Scientific Civil Service spanned four decades. He was responsible for the software of one of the UK's first electronic computers, the TRE Automatic Computer (TREAC) followed by the UK's first solid state computer, the Royal Radar Establishment Automatic Computer. He is the author of the book Probability and Information Theory, with Applications to Radar.

During World War II, Woodward developed a mathematical beam-shaping technique for radar antennas, which was later to become standard in the analysis of communication signals. His principal achievement in radar was to evaluate the ambiguities inherent in all radar signals and to show how Bayesian probability can be used as part of the design process to eliminate all but the wanted information the echoes might contain.

In 1956, Woodward's work on radar information theory led Nobel Prize winning physicist John Hasbrouck Van Vleck to invite him to give a postgraduate course on random processes at Harvard University. Professor Edwin Thompson Jaynes in his posthumously published book recognized Woodward as having been "many years ahead of his time" and as having shown "prophetic insight into what was to come" in the application of probability and statistics to the recovery of data from noisy samples. In the 1960s, Woodward's computer software team in Malvern provided the Royal Radar Establishment with the ALGOL 68-R compiler, the world's first implementation of the programming language ALGOL 68, and provided the armed services with their first standard high-level programming language, CORAL 66, for the small military computers of the day.

His academic posts have included honorary professor in electrical engineering at the University of Birmingham and visiting professor in cybernetics at the University of Reading. When in 2000, the Woodward Building was opened by Sir John Chisholm at the Defence Evaluation and Research Agency, now privatized as QinetiQ, guests were given complimentary clocks as souvenirs of the occasion and of Woodward's horological interests.

In June 2005, the Royal Academy of Engineering gave Woodward its first Lifetime Achievement Award, recognizing him as an outstanding pioneer of radar and for his work in precision mechanical horology. In 2009 he received the Institute of Electrical and Electronics Engineers Dennis J. Picard Medal for Radar Technologies and Applications: "for pioneering work of fundamental importance in radar waveform design, including the Woodward ambiguity function, the standard tool for waveform and matched filter analysis".

== Achievements in horology ==
In retirement, Woodward wrote another book, My Own Right Time, known as MORT, a record of his passion for horology. Along with many other topics, MORT describes in detail the design of his clocks, including his masterpiece W5.

Woodward contributed dozens of articles to horological periodicals over more than 30 years. From his experience as a mathematician and analyst of complex systems, he has made major contributions to scientific horology, including the definitive analysis of balance springs and much work on the properties of pendulums. In 2006 the British Horological Institute published a hard-cover collection of 63 articles with new notes by Woodward. The collection, Woodward on Time, originally compiled by Bill Taylor, ASC, became known as WOT. It was very well received.

=== W5 clock ===
W5 was built in a small workshop with simple tools, and displays an elegance of concept and design rarely seen in the history of the science. It was acclaimed by Jonathan Betts, the senior curator of horology at the Royal Observatory, Greenwich as "the nearest approach to perfection by any mechanical timekeeper not employing a vacuum chamber". Woodward also built the case, assembling it with intricate but invisible hidden mitre joints.

The horologist Anthony Randall carried on a long series of timekeeping trials of W5, showing unprecedented accuracy over periods of more than 100 days. Although the clock was widely celebrated, and Woodward published a series of detailed articles on its construction to encourage others to carry its ideas forward, no one completed another clock like it for more than twenty years. Finally, in 2006, the Australian clockmaker David Walter (now of Buellton, California) succeeded in making a highly skeletonized version that, while quite different in details, closely followed the basic Woodward design.

== Personal ==
Woodward was born on 6 September 1919 and educated at Blundell's School in Tiverton, Devon.

He met his wife, mathematician Alice Mary Winter Robertson (1917-1999) whilst they shared an office in Durnford House in Langton Matravers as part of the Telecommunications Research Establishment. She detailed the field solution for a slab loaded rectangular waveguide. They married after 18 months of meeting, in August 1942, and took their honeymoon after the war, travelling through Europe in an MG, later naming their house after Fionnay, a hamlet in Switzerland.

He lived in Malvern, Worcestershire, England, where he died on 30 January 2018 at the age of 98.
