= Susan G. Bond =

British scientific officer and computer programmer

Susan Bond
- Born: 1942 (age 83–84); Essex
- Occupations: Science researcher, research manager
- Years active: 1965–1993
- Known for: Computing research
- Notable work: ALGOL 68-R

Susan Bond (born 1942), was a scientific officer and computer programmer for the Mathematics Division of the Royal Radar Establishment (RRE) in the United Kingdom. She worked extensively on the programming language ALGOL 68 and the Royal Radar Establishment Automatic Computer (RREAC), an early solid-state electronics, ICL 1907F computer.

== Early life ==
Bond was born in 1942 and grew up in Dagenham, Essex, in the United Kingdom (UK). Both her parents were teachers, and she was an only child. She studied at Bristol University from 1962 to 1965, where she studied mathematics and science and received first-class honours.

== Career and research ==
After graduating from Bristol, Bond was interested in working in applied mathematics, although she didn't have computer training before then. She applied to and joined the Mathematics Division of the RRE in 1965; she was hired by British mathematician and engineer Philip Woodward. Her work mostly consisted of writing operating systems and compilers, not "numerical" computing. At the start of her career, Bond was the only female scientific officer with a graduate education at RRE. Bond later learned that her supervisor Woodward had been, as historian Janet Abbate describes, "'actively recruiting women' as an affordable source of high-quality researchers".

One of her first projects was reimplementing Syntax Improving Device (SID), a compiler-compiler tool developed by fellow RRE employee Michael Foster, to generate compilers for high-level programming languages. Afterward, she worked with Ian Currie on CORAL 64, a high-level language for embedded system computers.

=== Implementing ALGOL 68 ===
The RRE had originally used ALGOL 60 for the RREAC from its initial development in 1963. After the International Federation for Information Processing (IFIP) published the specifications for the more powerful ALGOL 68 in 1968, RRE attempted to adapt it for use on the RREAC. Bond worked with John Morison and Ian Currie on ALGOL 68-R, the first compiler implementation of ALGOL 68, and they announced its creation at the 20–24 July 1970 IFIP Working Conference on ALGOL 68 Implementation in Munich. Their ALGOL 68-R was an adaptation of the ALGOL 60 compiler they had built for RREAC. The team that worked on ALGOL 68-R intended for the language to become the RRE's primary programming language, which could be used for scientific programming as well as business administration tasks like payroll and taking inventory.

After the publication of the ALGOL 68-R specifications, Bond and Woodward published a narrative guide to ALGOL 68, titled "ALGOL 68-R User’s Guide" through HM Stationery Office. The initial 17,000 copy run sold out. Bond effectively provided ongoing support for the compiler: readers would contact her whenever they had trouble implementing it. Bond and Woodward continued to update and publish new versions of their guide for the RRE's later implementations of ALGOL, such as ALGOL 68RS. One reviewer, Richard Shreeve, contested that while their 1983 title Guide to ALGOL 68 for Users of RS Systems was an "excellent reference text", it gives "insufficient help to the beginner or newcomer to ALGOL 68".

=== Promotion to superintendent ===
In 1976, the RRE merged with several other research institutions into a renamed Royal Signals and Radar Establishment. In 1980, Bond was promoted to Superintendent of Computing and Software Research there. As part of her role, Bond collaborated with the Open Software Foundation on an international open technical standard for Unix operating systems, named the Architecture Neutral Distribution Format, and on computing policy for the UK Ministry of Defense.

Bond retired from work in 1993.

== Personal life ==
Bond met her husband, Chris Sennett, while working at the RRE.
