= Royal Radar Establishment =

Former research centre in Malvern, Worcestershire, England

The Royal Radar Establishment was a research centre in Malvern, Worcestershire in the United Kingdom. It was formed in 1953 as the Radar Research Establishment by the merger of the Air Ministry's Telecommunications Research Establishment (TRE) and the British Army's Radar Research and Development Establishment (RRDE). It was given its new name after a visit by Queen Elizabeth II in 1957. Both names were abbreviated to RRE. In 1976 the Signals Research and Development Establishment (SRDE), involved in communications research, joined the RRE to form the Royal Signals and Radar Establishment (RSRE).

The two groups had been closely associated since before the opening of World War II, when the predecessor to RRDE was formed as a small group within the Air Ministry's research centre in Bawdsey Manor in Suffolk. Forced to leave Bawdsey due to its exposed location on the east coast of England, both groups moved several times before finally settling in separate locations in Malvern beginning in May 1942. The merger in 1953 that formed the RRE renamed these as the North Site (RRDE) and South Site (TRE).

The earlier research and development work of TRE and RRDE on radar was expanded into solid state physics, electronics, and computer hardware and software. The RRE's overall scope was extended to include cryogenics and other topics. Infrared detection for guided missiles and heat sensing devices was a major defence application. The SRDE brought satellite communications and fibre optics knowledge.

In 1991 they were partially privatized as part of the Defence Research Agency, which became the Defence Evaluation and Research Agency in 1996. The North Site was closed in 2003 and the work was consolidated at the South Site, while the former North Site was sold off for housing developments. Qinetiq now occupies a part of the former RSRE site.

== Administrative history ==
The earliest concerted effort to develop radar in the UK dates to 1935, and Robert Watt replied to an Air Ministry question about radio-based death rays by stating they were impossible, but using radio as a detection means was possible. After a simple practical demonstration, a prototype system was built at Orfordness on the east coast of England. While on a Sunday drive in the area, Watt noticed the large and unused Bawdsey Manor, and this was leased by the Air Ministry to become first radar research centre in the country. Soon after taking over Bawdsey in 1936, the British Army heard of their efforts and formed a group to work with them to develop ground-based applications. The first project of this "Army Cell" was a ranging system for anti-aircraft artillery, but they soon added the Coast Defence radars and began work on the proximity fuse.

At the outbreak of the war in 1939, the location of Bawdsey, right on the east coast, was considered far too exposed to attack. The Air Ministry team quickly moved to Dundee in Scotland, where the former Air Ministry Experimental Station became the Air Ministry Research Establishment (AMRE). The Army group moved to Christchurch, outside Bournemouth, becoming the Air Defence Experimental Establishment (ADEE). The facilities in Dundee proved far too small and isolated, and in May 1940 they moved again, this time to Worth Matravers on the south coast of England, also a short distance from Bournemouth. This was accompanied by yet another renaming, now becoming the Telecommunications Research Establishment (TRE).

Ultimately they began to worry that this location was also too exposed, and when they heard a German paratroop unit had moved to France directly across the English Channel, they decided to move once again. The ADEE, by this time once again renamed to the Air Defence Research and Development (ADRDE), moved to underutilized Air Ministry buildings on the north side of Malvern in May 1942. This, of course, resulted in yet another name change to the RRDE. The TRE followed shortly thereafter, taking up residence in buildings across from Malvern College on the south side of town.

TRE was part of the Ministry of Supply and, when it was formed, so was RRE. In 1959, control passed to the Ministry of Aviation. When this was abolished in 1967, control passed to the Ministry of Technology, then to the Ministry of Aviation Supply, in 1970, and to the Ministry of Defence in 1971. In 1976 RRE merged with the Signals Research and Development Establishment (SRDE) to form the Royal Signals and Radar Establishment (RSRE), which became part of the Defence Research Agency (DRA) in 1991. Later (1995), DRA was absorbed into DERA, the Defence Evaluation and Research Agency. DERA split on 2 June 2001 into two parts, a government body called Dstl (Defence Science and Technology Laboratory) and a company destined for privatisation, which became QinetiQ.

The technical departments of RRE were grouped, initially, into six Divisions: airborne radar, ground radar, guided weapons, basic techniques, physics, and engineering. The organization and personnel are described further, in a collection of linked web sites.

W. J. Richards, CBE, was Director of TRE at the time of the merger and continued as Director of RRE. William Henry (Bill) Penley, Head of Guided Missiles, took over for a year in 1961. Then George Macfarlane (after postings outside RRE) became Director in 1962.

== The Physics Division – some of the staff and their work ==
At the time of the name change to Radar Research Establishment in 1953, the senior staff included:

- Robert Allan Smith (known as R.A. and as Robin). He was Head of the Physics Division, with a staff of about 150. Having worked previously on aspects of radio and radar, his attention had become focused on solid state physics, because of the importance of semiconductors in the development of electronics and infra-red detectors. His early books had dealt with radionavigation, aerials for short wave radio, and thermodynamics. After the name change to RRE, his "most significant book, in historical terms", on the detection of infra-red radiation, was coauthored with F. E. Jones and R. P. Chasmar and published in 1968. The book "for which [he] is best known" is on semiconductors. His other books dealt with wave mechanics of crystalline solids, and, as editor, very high resolution spectroscopy. He left RRE to become Professor of Physics at the University of Sheffield in 1961, came to MIT as Director of the Center for Materials Science and Engineering a year later, and became Vice-Chancellor of Heriot-Watt University in 1968, retiring in 1974. He was an FRS, an FRSE, and received an OBE.
- George G. Macfarlane. He held a special appointment as Superintendent of the Physics Department, having been assigned to direct the work in theoretical physics. He had been trained as an electrical engineer, and had worked on theoretical aspects of radar prior to the name change of the establishment. One of the designers of the Royal Radar Establishment Automatic Computer. Later, he became Deputy Director of the National Physical Laboratory, then Director of RRE, then Controller of Research at the Ministry of Technology and then Defence. He was knighted for his work.
- R. P. Chasmar, Head of the infra-red group and co-author of the book mentioned above.
- Tom Elliott (Charles Thomas Elliott), physicist, at RRE from the late 1960s through transition to DERA. He invented the SPRITE detector, and contributed to the development of cadmium mercury telluride as an industrial semiconductor. The "Tom Elliott Conference Centre" at the site is named in his honour. He was made an FRS and CBE, received a Rank medal, and joined Heriot-Watt University. Elected Fellow of the Royal Society.
- Alan F. Gibson. Head of Transistor Group at RRE, then the first Professor of Physics at the University of Essex in 1963, and later Head of Laser Division of Rutherford Laboratory (1975–1983). He was named Fellow of the Royal Society in 1978.
- Cyril Hilsum, physicist. Work in industrial and government laboratories and in academe includes theoretical solid state physics and development of liquid crystals. Elected Fellow of the Royal Academy of Engineering and Fellow of the Royal Society, recipient of Max Born Prize and Faraday Medal. In 1974 he became Chief Scientific Officer at RRE.
- Edward G. S. Paige. Worked on semiconductors, with Denis Maines turned to Surface acoustic wave (SAW) devices, led team that received Wolfe Medal of MOD and earned RRE a Queen's Award, later Professor of Electrical Engineering at the University of Oxford, awarded Rayleigh Medal and Duddell Medal.
- Leo Pincherle. Head of the theoretical solid state physics group, and authority on band structure theory. His monograph on this topic was published in 1971. He also published a standard text on heat and thermodynamics, during his later appointment as Professor of Physics at Bedford College, London.
- Albert M. Uttley, mathematician, computer scientist and experimental psychologist. Designed AI trainer, the TREAC digital computer, and contributed to early discussions of cybernetics. Continued human factors work at National Physical Laboratory and then as Research Professor in the Experimental Psychology Laboratory of the University of Sussex.
- Philip Woodward had pioneered the application of probability theory to the filtering of radar signals, and wrote a monograph on the topic. His results included the Woodward Ambiguity Function, "the standard tool for waveform and matched filter analysis". He continued to direct theoretical work on radar after the establishment changed its name. Later, he led the group that developed the Coral 66 computer programming language. He was, at different times, Honorary Professor in Electrical Engineering at the University of Birmingham and visiting professor in Cybernetics at the University of Reading. In 2000, the Woodward Building named in his honour was opened on the site that had then become DERA by Sir John Chisholm. In 2005, he received a Lifetime Achievement Award from the Royal Academy of Engineering. In 2009, he received the Dennis J. Picard Medal of the Institute of Electrical and Electronics Engineers (IEEE), for Radar Technologies and Applications.

Other members of the Physics Division who made significant contributions to several fields of endeavour include:

- William Bardsley, physicist. His work at Malvern on growing crystals was published in a series of papers that have been referenced over 200 times through the time of writing (2010), in work on semiconductor devices and, in one instance, space science.
- Michael P. Barnett, (1929–2012). At Malvern he worked on theory of semiconductors, including organic materials. Later, he taught at MIT, the University of London, Columbia University and City University of New York. His earlier publications on several topics has been followed by more recent work on computational chemistry and symbolic calculation.
- Paul N. Butcher, theoretical solid state physics. After working at Malvern, he was appointed to a chair at the University of Warwick, and has published four books.
- Geoffrey V. Chester, theoretical physicist. At Malvern (1953–54), he worked on mathematical problems of radar. Later, at Cornell University, he was Director of the Laboratory of Atomic and Solid State Physics (1968–74) and Dean of the College of Arts and Sciences (1986–91).
- J. B. Gunn, solid state physicist. At Malvern he worked on the physics of electronic devices. Later, at the IBM Research Laboratories in the U.S., he discovered the Gunn effect used in the Gunn diode.

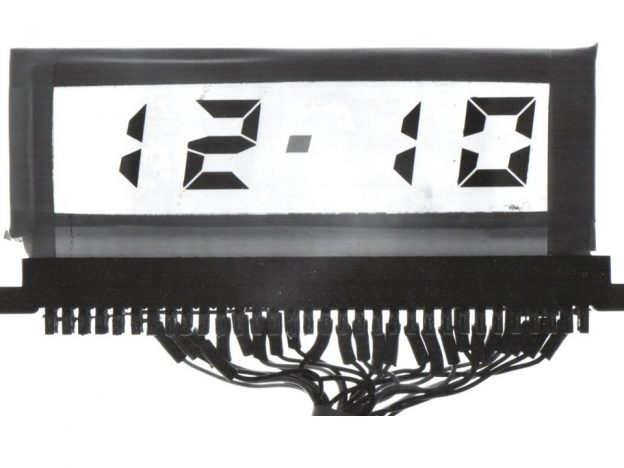
Demonstration digital clock using Cyanobiphenyl liquid crystals made at RRE in 1973

- Several staff members under the supervision of Cyril Hilsum, in conjunction with George Gray and Ken Harrison of the University of Hull, developed new, stable liquid crystals in 1972, which were an immediate success as the basis of display devices in the electronics and consumer products industries. This received the Queen's Award for Technological Achievement in 1979. Patents from this development yielded royalties over £100 million, the largest of any MOD patent.
- William D. Lawson, co-recipient of Rank Prize for Optoelectronics in 1976,
- Trevor Simpson Moss, solid state physicist, author of definitive monographs Photoconductivity of the elements and Optical Properties of semiconductors, and series editor of Handbook on Semiconductors of the North-Holland Publishing Company.
- S. Nielson, co-recipient of Rank Prize for Optoelectronics in 1976,
- J. Michael Radcliffe, theoretical physicist. Later, he turned to academe at the Carnegie Institute of Technology in the U.S., and he was listed as coauthor in a revised edition of Born's Atomic Physics.
- Dennis Sciama, later cosmologist and FRS. At RRE he coauthored work on band structure calculations.
- A.S. Young, co-recipient of Rank Prize for Optoelectronics in 1976.

In 1956, R.A. Smith presented a comprehensive account of the contributions of RRE to physics to the Royal Society.

== Radar, Guided weapons and Engineering Divisions ==
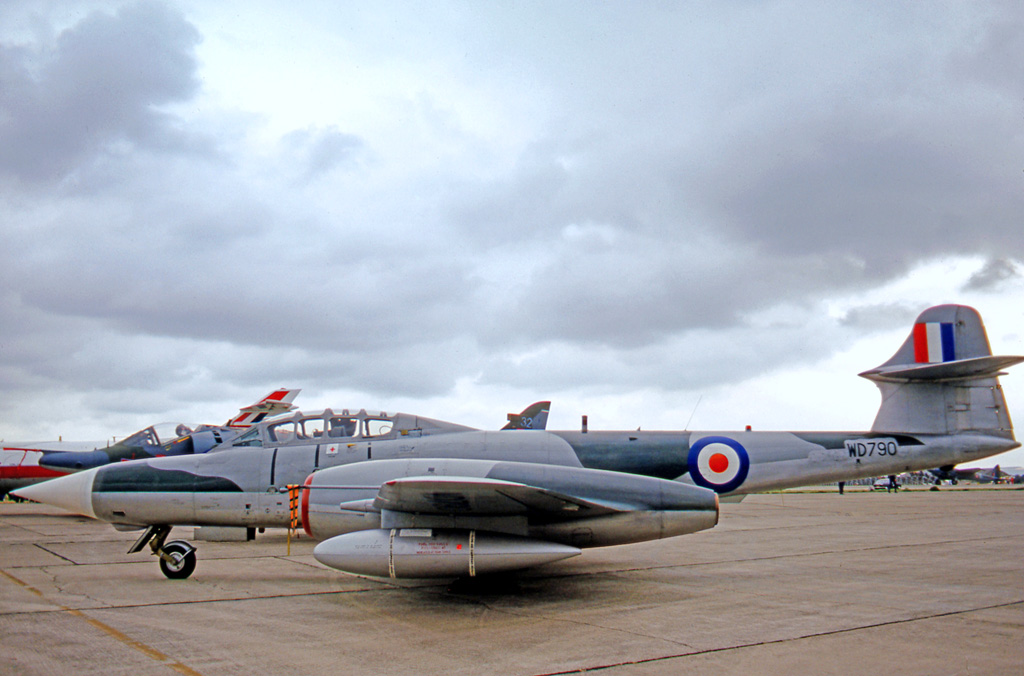
Gloster Meteor NF.11 fitted with modified radar nose during trials work when allocated to the RRE during 1976.

Although less conspicuous among academic scientists, these divisions were major players in the defence community, both in policy decision making and as an interface with industry. Development and production contracts brought staff of several companies on site, and extramural contracts strengthened ties with industry still further. "in radar alone: Plessey and Decca for aerials and waveguides, Plessey, Hilger & Watts, Clarke Chapman and Curran for millimetre-wave radar, and Mullard for precision bombing and radar reconnaissance". On returning to RRE as Director in 1962, George Macfarlane reorganized the technical departments into: Military and Civil Systems (comprising Ground Radar and Air Traffic Control, Guided Weapons and Airborne Radar groups), Physics and Electronics (comprising Physics and Electronic Groups) and Engineering. "Despite the policy shift away from fighters ... to guided weapons for UK air defence, ... RRE continued to argue for strike aircraft and kept up the necessary radar research programs."

In December 1968, the report on the programming language ALGOL 68 was published. On 20–24 July 1970, a working conference was arranged by the International Federation for Information Processing (IFIP) to discuss the problems of implementing the language. A small team from RRE attended to present their compiler, written by I. F. Currie, Susan G. Bond, and J. D. Morrison. ALGOL 68 was complex: implementing it was estimated to need up to 100 man-years, using multi-pass compilers with up to seven passes. The RRE team described how they had already implemented a one-pass compiler, which was already in production for engineering and scientific uses. It was the first working version of ALGOL 68.

Senior staff, of the divisions at various times included

- G.W.A (Geoffrey) Dummer, electronics engineer. His early work is described in the TRE article. His oversight of the large contingent of electronics contractors continued, and he was appointed Superintendent of Applied Physics. In 1964 he sponsored a symposium on Electronic Beam Techniques for Microelectronics at R.R.E. He published over 30 books, was responsible for much further publishing on electronics. He was awarded an MBE, the American Medal of Freedom, the Wakefield Gold Medal of the Royal Aeronautical Society, and the Cledo Brunetti Award of the Institute of Electronic and Electrical Engineers
- W. H. (Bill) Penley, physicist. Head of Guided Weapons at time of name change. Later Director of RRE, then Controller of Establishments and Research – responsible for the whole Defence research programme.
- John Robert Mills joined TRE in 1939 as a post grad physicist, working initially on radar development and later, as a member of the (Offensive) Airborne Radar Division, the development of infra-red and radar targeting and reconnaissance systems. He left RRE in 1960 and spent about a year at the Ministry of Defence (MOD), London followed by five years as head of Radio Department at the Royal Aircraft Establishment in Farnborough before becoming Director of Signal Research and Development Establishment in Christchurch. He returned to RRE, which became the Royal Signals and Radar Establishment (RSRE), in 1976 as Deputy Director until his retirement in 1977.

More than 50 books were written by members of the establishment under its successive names. Details are included in the list of references below, and in the TRE article. Many more were in series that members of the staff edited.

In 1968, the Minister of Supply assured a member of parliament that the results of research at RRE on infra-red detectors would be made available to British industry.

A former member of the RRE, Martin Woodhouse, later became better known as a novelist.

== Locations ==
- North Site: 52°08′03″N 2°20′06″W
- South Site: 52°06′00″N 2°18′58″W
