= Defence Research Establishments =

UK government establishments

The Defence Research Establishments were a number of separate UK Ministry of Defence Research Establishments, dating back to World War II, World War I, or even earlier. Each establishment had its own head; known as the Director or the Superintendent. Prior to the formation of the Ministry of Defence each of the three Services, i.e. the Royal Air Force, the Admiralty and the War Office, had their own research establishments; although some establishments had tri-service functions.

== World War II ==
At the beginning of World War II there were about a dozen research and development establishments. The main ones were:

- The Royal Aircraft Establishment - Air
- The Aeroplane and Armament Experimental Establishment - Air
- The Telecommunications Research Establishment - Air
- The Admiralty Research Laboratory - Sea
- The Admiralty Compass Observatory - Sea
- The Naval Construction Research Establishment - Sea
- The Armaments Research Department - Triservice

== Formation, merging and breakup ==
Many establishments were formed, merged or changed their names over time to meet the needs of the UK Government at the time. These changes also involved the opening of new sites, operating across multiple sites, change of site location; and closing of sites.

For example, the Explosives Research and Development Establishment (ERDE), merged with the Rocket Propulsion Establishment and became the Propellants, Explosives and Rocket Motor Establishment (PERME). PERME became part of the Royal Armament Research and Development Establishment (RARDE).

== Amalgamation into DERA and split into QinetiQ and Dstl ==
Some of these establishments were merged in 1991 to form the Defence Research Agency (DRA). More were added to DRA in 1995 to form the Defence Evaluation and Research Agency (DERA).

DERA was split up in the early 2000s, with the major part becoming known as QinetiQ and the more sensitive parts retained as Dstl.

== See also ==
- Royal Aircraft Establishment (RAE)
- Royal Armament Research and Development Establishment (RARDE)
- Royal Signals and Radar Establishment (RSRE)
