= C. Thomas Elliott =

British physicist

Charles Thomas Elliott (known as Tom Elliott), CBE FRS (born 16 January 1939), is an English scientist in the fields of narrow gap semiconductor and infrared detector research.

== Early life ==
Hailing from County Durham, he attended Washington Grammar Technical School. After gaining his Ph.D. he worked at the University of Manchester

== Career ==
He joined RRE in Malvern, Worcestershire in the late 1960s. In the 1970s he invented the SPRITE detector (Signal PRocessing In The Element) which was also known as the TED (Tom Elliott's Detector). This was a photoconductor device in which the infrared scene was scanned across the detector (made from HgCdTe) at the same rate as the carriers drifted under an applied controlled constant bias current. This device became part of TICM - the standard UK thermal imaging common module used since the 1980s by UK armed forces. Tom Elliott received a Rank Prize in 1982 for this work and was elected a Fellow of the Royal Society in 1988. He was appointed CBE in the 1994 Birthday Honours.

He won the Clifford Paterson Medal and Prize in 1997.

Tom Elliott also contributed to the development of the semiconductor indium antimonide (InSb) as an infrared detector, magnetic sensor and fast, low voltage transistor material. He was involved in the exploitation of negative luminescence in diode structures.

He retired from the successor to RRE, DERA in 1999 and is an honorary professor at Heriot-Watt University.

== Personal life ==
A conference centre at DERA Malvern (by 2007 QinetiQ) was named 'The Tom Elliott Centre' in his honour when opened by the Princess Royal in 2007. He lives in Malvern.

== Bibliography ==
- Infrared Detectors and Emitters: Materials and Devices, edited by Peter Capper and C T Elliott, Springer (2000) ISBN 0-7923-7206-9
- An infrared detector with integrated signal processing, C. T. Elliott, Electron Devices Meeting, 1982 International, Vol. 28 Page(s): 132 - 135 (1982)
- Uncooled InSb/In_{1–x}Al_{x}Sb mid-infrared emitter, T. Ashley, C. T. Elliott, N. T. Gordon, R. S. Hall, A. D. Johnson, and G. J. Pryce, Applied Physics Letters Vol. 64, Iss. 18, pp. 2433-2435 (1994) doi:10.1063/1.111981
- Negative luminescence and its applications, C. T. Elliott, Philosophical Transactions: Mathematical, Physical and Engineering Sciences, Vol. 359, Number 1780 pp. 567 - 579 (2001) doi:10.1098/rsta.2000.0743

== See also ==
- SPRITE infrared detector
- Negative luminescence
