= NAG Numerical Library =

Software library of numerical-analysis algorithms

The NAG Numerical Library is a commercial software product developed and sold by The Numerical Algorithms Group Ltd. It is a software library of numerical-analysis routines, containing more than 1,900 mathematical and statistical algorithms. Areas covered by the library include linear algebra, optimization, quadrature, the solution of ordinary and partial differential equations, regression analysis, and time series analysis.

Users of the NAG Library call its routines from within their applications to incorporate its mathematical or statistical functionality and to solve numerical problems - for example, finding the minimum or maximum of a function, fitting a curve or surface to data, or solving a differential equation. The NAG Library can be accessed from a variety of programming languages and environments such as C/C++, Fortran,Python, MATLAB, Java, and .NET. A separate library supports Automatic differentiation (AD). The main supported systems are currently Windows, Linux and macOS running on x86-64 architectures; 32-bit Windows support is being phased out. Some NAG mathematical optimization solvers are accessible via the optimization modelling suite.

== History ==
The original version of the NAG Library was written in ALGOL 60 and Fortran. It contained 98 user-callable routines, and was released for the International Computers Limited (ICL) 1906A and 1906S machines on October 1, 1971. Three further Marks of the library appeared in the following five years; during this time the ALGOL version was ported to ALGOL 68, with the following platforms being supported: CDC 7600/CYBER (CDC ALGOL 68), IBM 360/370/AMDAHL (FLACC ALGOL 68), ICL 1900 (ALGOL 68R), ICL 1906A/S (ALGOL 68R), ICL 2900 (ALGOL 68RS) and Telefunken TR440 (ALGOL 68C).

The first partially vectorized implementation of the NAG Fortran Library for the Cray-1 was released in 1983, while the first release of the NAG Parallel Library (which was specially designed for distributed memory parallel computer architectures) was in the early 1990s. Mark 1 of the NAG C Library was released in 1990. In 1992, the Library incorporated LAPACK routines for the first time; NAG had been a collaborator in the LAPACK project since 1987. The first release of the NAG Library for SMP & Multicore, which takes advantage of the shared memory parallelism of Symmetric Multi-Processors (SMP) and multicore processors, appeared in 1997 for multiprocessor machines built using the Dec Alpha and SPARC architectures. The NAG Library for .NET, which is a CLI DLL assembly containing methods and objects that give Common Language Infrastructure (CLI) users access to NAG algorithms, was first released in 2010.

== Current version ==
Mark 29 of the NAG Library includes mathematical and statistical algorithms organised into chapters.

== See also ==
- List of numerical-analysis software
- List of numerical libraries
