= Royal Radar Establishment Automatic Computer =

Early solid-state computer

The Royal Radar Establishment Automatic Computer (RREAC) was an early solid-state computer in 1962. It was made with transistors; many of Britain's previous experimental computers used the thermionic valve, also known as a vacuum tube.

== History ==
=== Background ===
Britain had built the world's first electronic computer, the Colossus computer, during the war at Bletchley Park in late 1943 and early 1944, and the world's first stored-program computer, the Manchester Baby, on 21 June 1948. The Germans had built the electro-mechanical Z3 in 1941 in Berlin, which used relays. The world's first digital computing device was the Atanasoff–Berry computer in 1942. ENIAC was built in 1946 at the Moore School of Electrical Engineering at the University of Pennsylvania. ENIAC and Colossus both claim to be the world's first electronic computer. Electronic Delay Storage Automatic Calculator (EDSAC) ran its first programs on 6 May 1949 at the University of Cambridge Mathematical Laboratory about a month after the Manchester Mark 1 was put to research work at the University of Manchester. In May 1952 Geoffrey Dummer thought up the idea of the integrated circuit at the TRE, the former name of the RRE.

By April 1962 there were 323 computers installed in Britain, which had cost around £23 million (£429 million in today's figures). At the time, the American government alone had over 900 computers, with over 10,000 in the whole country. However most of these performed simple tasks that a pocket calculator would later manage.

Computer research in the UK took place at various sites including the National Physical Laboratory in Teddington, and the RRE in Worcestershire. (RREAC replaced TREAC, the first bit-parallel computer developed in the UK, which had been developed at the TRE.) Manchester University led the way again in 1962 with its Atlas Computer, then said to be the most powerful computer in the world, being one of the world's first supercomputers. Three were built: the first for Manchester University, and one each for BP and for the Atlas Computer Laboratory in Oxfordshire. A major British computer manufacturer at the time was International Computers and Tabulators (ICT), later part of Britain's International Computers Limited (ICL). The RRE College of Electronics, like the RRE itself, was run by the Ministry of Aviation in the 1960s.

In September 1963 the government, via the Department of Industrial and Scientific Research, funded £1 million of research into electronics and computers, with half going to the RRE and NPL.

Later in its existence, the RRE provided Britain's first connection to the Internet, when opened by the Queen in 1976 at UCL in London; it went via RRE to Norway and on to the USA. Later in 1984, the Internet's engineering task force first met at RRE's successor - the Royal Signals and Radar Establishment

=== The RREAC ===
Work in transistor technology at RRE took place in the Physics Department under Dr R.A. Smith. The RREAC was first announced in 1962. It was earlier known as the RRE All-Transistor Computer. It was built from 1960. George G. Macfarlane was one of the designers.

RREAC had a 36-bit word and 24K words of core store, and used five-hole paper tape for input and output, and magnetic tape for data storage.

The world's first transistorised computer was the Manchester Transistor Computer, operational in 1953. The 1955 Harwell CADET is a contender for the title of first fully transistorised computer. Many of the early transistorised computers used valves for non-computing elements such as the power supply and clock.

== Software ==
RREAC used ALGOL 60 as its programming language - the first computer language to use nested functions, and the ancestor of some of today's main programming languages.

== See also ==
- Flex machine
- List of transistorized computers
