= Aeroplane and Armament Experimental Establishment =

British military aviation research facility

The Aeroplane and Armament Experimental Establishment (A&AEE) was a research facility for British military aviation from 1918 to 1992. Established at Martlesham Heath, Suffolk, the unit moved in 1939 to Boscombe Down, Wiltshire, where its work continues following privatisation as part of the Qinetiq company.

== History ==
In 1917, the Experimental Aircraft Flight of the Central Flying School was transferred from RAF Upavon, Wiltshire to a site on the heathland at Martlesham, Suffolk, and on 16 January 1917 Martlesham Heath Airfield was officially opened, as an experimental airfield. The unit was renamed the Aeroplane Experimental Unit, Royal Flying Corps. After the end of the First World War, the site continued to be used. On 16 March 1920, it was renamed as the Aeroplane Experimental Establishment; on 24 March 1924, it was again renamed as the Aeroplane & Armament Experimental Establishment of the Royal Air Force.

At the outbreak of the Second World War, on 9 September, the A&AEE was removed to RAF Boscombe Down, Wiltshire, owing to the proximity of Martlesham Heath to the east coast and its vulnerability to enemy attack. Despite the relocation, the Establishment remained part of No. 23 Group RAF.

About fifty aircraft and the military and civilian personnel had arrived at Boscombe Down by mid-September 1939. The Establishment was declared "open" on 20 September though it lacked access to ranges to test weapons as well as other key facilities. The site had been established as a regional control centre ("Flying Control") for RAF Bomber Command; the Blind Approach Training and Development Unit was formed there that September. However aircraft operating facilities at the time were a grass field, a small area of hardstanding, five pre-1930s hangars and a single new one, and some other permanent structures. The use of grass runways contributed to numerous accidents at Boscombe Down. Wartime construction was temporary and underfunded; a concrete runway – considered essential to operate the larger aircraft under test – was not officially opened until October 1945. Two additional runways would subsequently be built.

Throughout the conflict, the A&AEE expanded its facilities in order to take on additional roles. Its activities including the testing of armaments, performance and acceptance trials for all new service aircraft, and the testing of "rogue" handling aircraft. It also developed improvements in aircraft equipment, such as demisting equipment for windshields and exhaust flame suppression.

In 1946, in common with most other military research establishments, the A&AEE came under the Ministry of Supply. In 1950, it absorbed the Airborne Forces Experimental Establishment. When the Ministry of Supply was wound up in 1959, control of the A&AEE was transferred to the Ministry of Aviation, then the Ministry of Technology in 1967, the Ministry of Aviation Supply in 1970, and then to the Ministry of Defence in 1971.

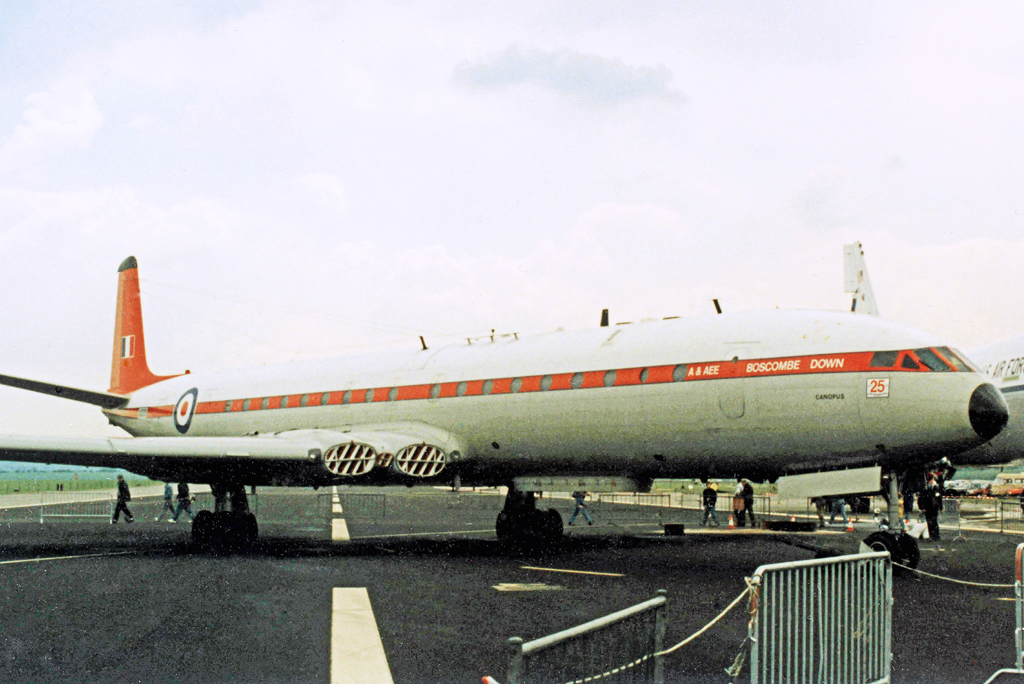
de Havilland Comet 4C test aircraft Canopus of the A&AEE at RAF Boscombe Down in 1990

The A&AEE remained involved in numerous milestones of the British aircraft industry throughout the Cold War era, including the trials of most aircraft flown by the British armed forces during this time. The first flights of several iconic aircraft, including the English Electric P 1 (forerunner of the Lightning interceptor), the Folland Gnat (a trainer aircraft flown by the Red Arrows display team), the Hawker Hunter (a transonic fighter aircraft) and the BAC TSR-2 (a cancelled strategic bomber and aerial reconnaissance aircraft). In addition to its work on military aircraft, several civil aircraft achieved their airworthiness certificate via the A&AEE, which operated a small bespoke section, the Civil Aircraft Test Section (CATS), which was the only civilian servicing unit within the Establishment; its work was eventually transferred to the Air Registration Board.

The site was shared with the School of Aviation Medicine. In terms of amenities, the establishment was equipped with extensive test facilities, including a wind tunnel (supporting speeds up to 400 mph (640 km/h)), a large environmental hangar (creating temperatures between −40 °C to +50 °C and humidities up to 100 percent) and a weighbridge that can weigh and determine the centre of gravity of aircraft up to 135 tons. Throughout the Cold War, the Establishment became increasingly computerised.

On 1 April 1992, the A&AEE was renamed the Aircraft and Armament Evaluation Establishment. Shortly thereafter, its experimental work moved to the Defence Research Agency. Responsibility for the site passed from the MoD Procurement Executive to the Defence Test and Evaluation Organisation (DTEO) in 1993. On 1 April 1996, it was reorganised as the Assessment & Evaluation Centre under the overall control of the Defence Evaluation and Research Agency (DERA). In 2001, DERA was split into two parts, one being the Defence Science and Technology Laboratory (Dstl) which remains within the civil service, while the remainder was allocated to the newly-created limited company QinetiQ, to which the staff at Boscombe Down were transferred.

== Organisation ==
The A&AEE's wartime organisation was two squadrons for testing aircraft and armaments, and a small number of flights. The establishment also hosted attached units; perhaps the most noteworthy of these being the Empire Test Pilots School, which was founded at Boscombe Down on 21 June 1943 as the Test Pilots' School. At its founding, it was the first such school of its kind. Due to the rapid growth of the A&AEE at Boscombe Down during the conflict, the school was relocated to RAF Cranfield in October 1945; it returned to Boscombe Down on 29 January 1968.

Performance Testing Squadron

- Three pre-war flights plus another raised during the war. Reorganised as A to D squadrons in 1944.

Armament Testing Squadron

- Three flights. Reorganised as flights in squadrons A and B and a Special Duties flight in 1944.
  - A (Gunnery) Flight
  - B (Bombing) Flight
  - C (Special Duty Flight)

Others

- High Altitude Flight
- Intensive Flying Development Unit
- Gun Proofing Flight
- BATDU/WIDU/109 Squadron (1939–1942)

Lodger and attached

- No. 58 Squadron RAF
- No. 56 Squadron RAF
- No. 249 Squadron RAF
- Handling Flight CFS
- Bomber Development Unit

During January 1988, A & B Squadrons joined to create the Fixed Wing Test Squadron which had three flights, D Squadron was renamed the Rotary Wing Test Squadron.

== Commanding officers ==
- Group Captain B McEntegart
- Group Captain R S Sorley
- Air Commodore R B Mansell
- Air Commodore D D'Arcy A. Greig
- Air Commodore J N Boothman – he had been a pre-war A&AEE pilot
- Air Commodore H P Fraser

== See also ==
- Telecommunications Research Establishment
- Royal Aircraft Establishment
- Royal Radar Establishment
- Seaplane Experimental Station
- Central Fighter Establishment
- Boscombe Down Aviation Collection
