= Language processor =

Language processor may refer to:

- Natural language processor, a computer programmed to process human (natural) languages
- Programming language processor, a computer program which translates a source program written in one programming language to another
