= Graham Love =

British businessman (born 1954)

Graham Love (born 18 March 1954) was the chief executive officer of the defence contractor, QinetiQ Group plc. He is a graduate of Cambridge University and a chartered accountant.

In the late 1980s he was part of the senior management team that expanded Weber Shandwick through a major acquisition programme involving the purchase of over 30 public relations agencies worldwide acting as its finance director.

In 1992, Love joined the UK Government's Defence Research Agency as Finance Director and continued in the role when the agency expanded into Defence Evaluation and Research Agency (DERA).

He was appointed managing director of the support services division (DSSD) in 1995. Two years later, he led the successful buy-out of DSSD from DERA to form Comax Secure Business Services Ltd. He subsequently led the team which negotiated the sale of Comax to Amey plc.

In 2001, Love rejoined DERA as Chief Financial Officer, subsequently playing a key role in the formation of QinetiQ and the sale of a controlling interest to The Carlyle Group.

Controversially, his £106,000 investment in the company was later worth £20m at flotation.

In 2005, Love became Chief Executive of QinetiQ, as the company moved to IPO. In October 2009, Love resigned his position after an official report into the crash of an ageing British Nimrod Maritime Patrol Aircraft over Afghanistan in 2006, which killed 14 people, found that QinetiQ bore some of the blame for the mistakes that led to the crash.

Love then joined LGC as chairman.

He was on the board of STEMNET (Science, Technology, Engineering and Mathematics Network) and the advisory board of SEMTA (Sector Skills Council for Science, Engineering and Manufacturing Technologies) and is a senior adviser at the Chertoff Group (a strategic advisory group focused on security, intelligence and government services).

Graham has also been chairman of Racing Green Cars, Eversholt Rail Group, SLR Consulting Group, 2E2, Xendo, Hanson Wade, Simply Sustainable and The Royal Mint, and a trustee and chair of the audit committee at MOLA (Museum of London Archaeology). He is currently chairman of Octric Semiconductors Ltd.

In his youth he was a talented stage performer, notably taking the title role in Cymbeline.
