= John Robert Mills =

John Mills
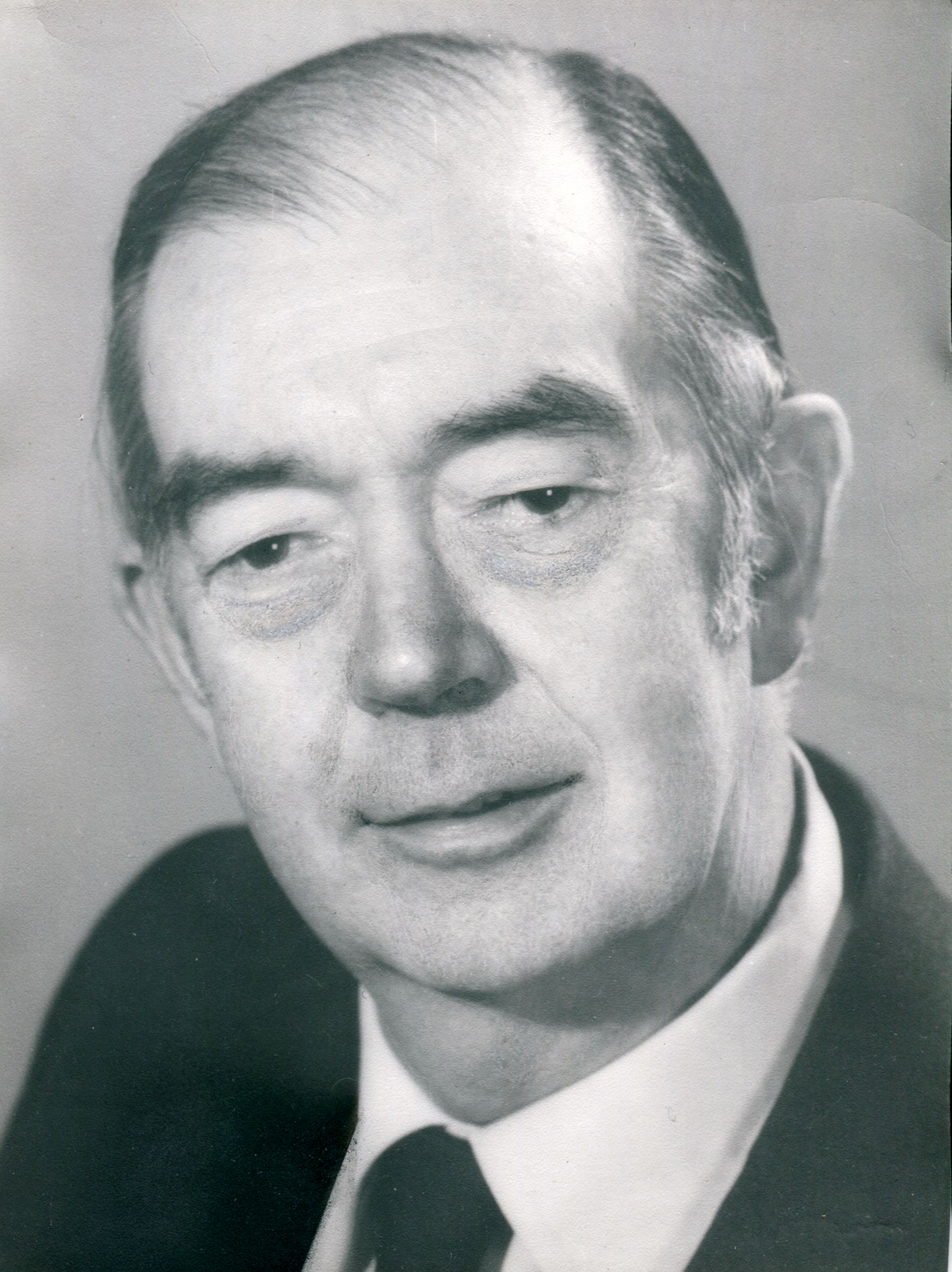
- John Mills aged 60 in 1976
- Born: 12 November 1916; Barnes, Surrey, England
- Died: 6 May 1998 (aged 81); Malvern, Worcestershire, England
- Education: King's College London
- Spouse: Pauline Phelps (m. 1950)
- Children: Two sons
- Awards: 1971 Fellow IEE (Now IET since 2006 )
- Scientific career
- Fields: Defence Scientist; Specialist in: Radar, Military Communications and Navigation Systems
- Workplaces: AMRE, Dundee; RAE, Farnbourough; TRE, RRE, Malvern; Min Tech, London; SRDE, Christchurch; RSRE, Malvern

John Robert Mills FIEE (12 November 1916 – 6 May 1998) was a British physicist and scientific expert who played an important role in the development of radar and the defence of Britain in World War II. After the war he continued his career working for various British government research establishments on a variety of projects until his retirement in 1977.

In addition to many achievements and contributions to military technological development, Mills was the first British scientist to receive radio-wave signals bounced off the Moon.

== Education and early career ==
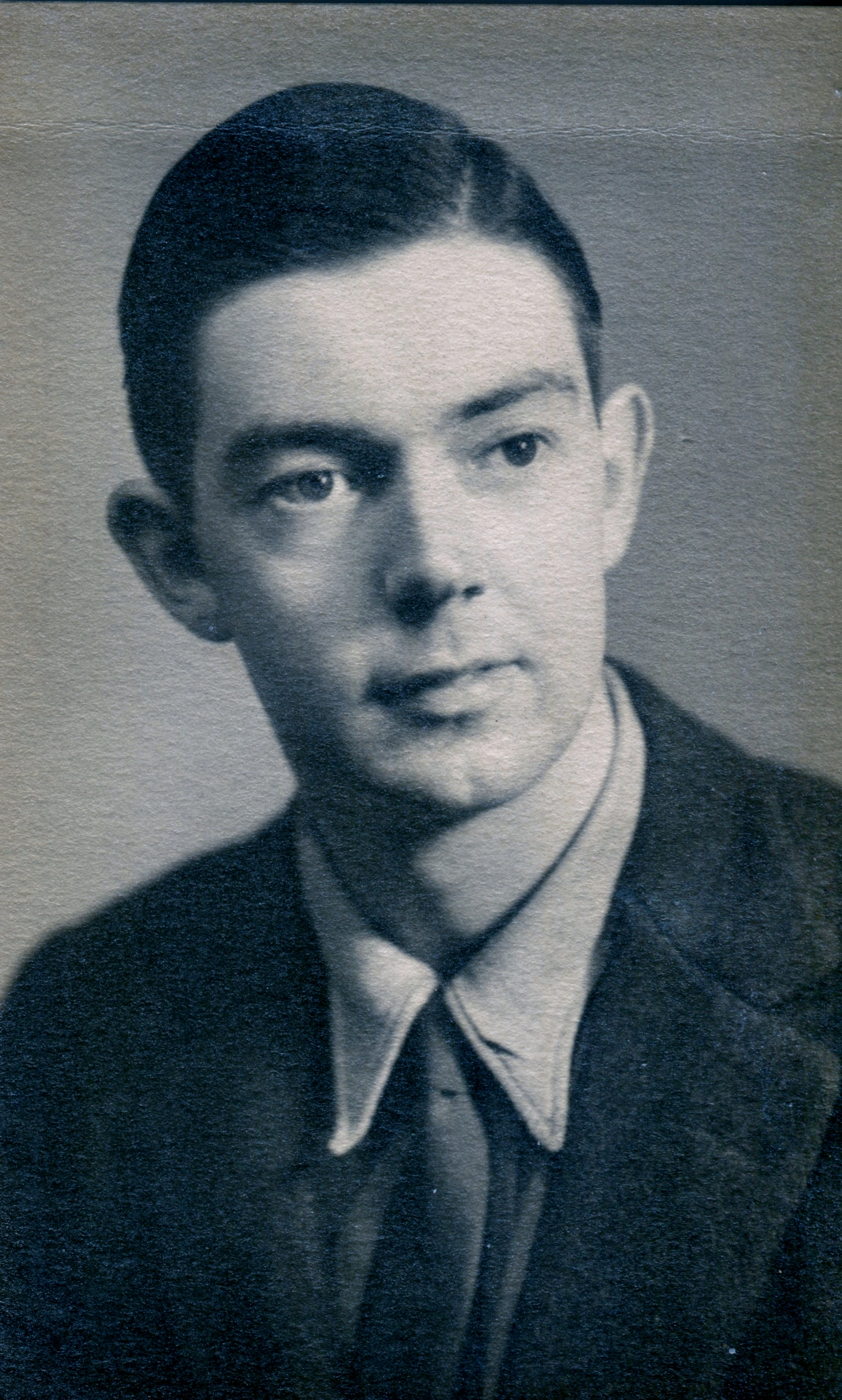
John Mills aged 24 in 1940

Following his education at the Kingston upon Thames Grammar School he gained a BSc in physics at King's College London in 1939 and later the same year he joined the Air Ministry Research Establishment in Dundee. In 1940, he moved to the Royal Aircraft Establishment (RAE) at Farnborough and in 1942 moved to the Telecommunications Research Establishment (TRE) in Malvern, which later became the Radar Research Establishment (RRE) and later still the Royal Radar Establishment (RRE); he stayed there until 1960.

John Mills was part of a groundbreaking group during the Second World War that established radar as both a meaningful defence, particularly against enemy aircraft, and guidance technology. This included air navigation systems and later, as a member of the (Offensive) Airborne Radar Division at RRE, the development of infra-red and radar targeting and reconnaissance systems for the Royal Air Force and Royal Navy.

The equipment developed for navigation, targeting and reconnaissance was further advanced for inclusion in the V bomber force and the BAC TSR-2, the most technically advanced aircraft of its era, as well as the development of the first successful sideways looking reconnaissance radar which was further developed by the US and led, amongst other things, to today's satellite radar systems.

== 1960-1967, MOD & RAE ==
Mills spent about a year at the Ministry of Defence (MOD) in London, followed by five years as head of Radio Department at RAE Farnborough where his responsibilities included:

- Electronic warfare systems,
- Very Low Frequency (VLF) navigation which led to the Omega system
- Radio propagation studies.

During this period his team received the first message bounced off the Moon from the US, work which eventually led to modern satellite communications. He also worked in the development of the first automatic aircraft landing system.

Mills was appointed Scientific Adviser to the Minister of Technology (Tony Benn) in 1966.

== 1967–1976, SRDE ==
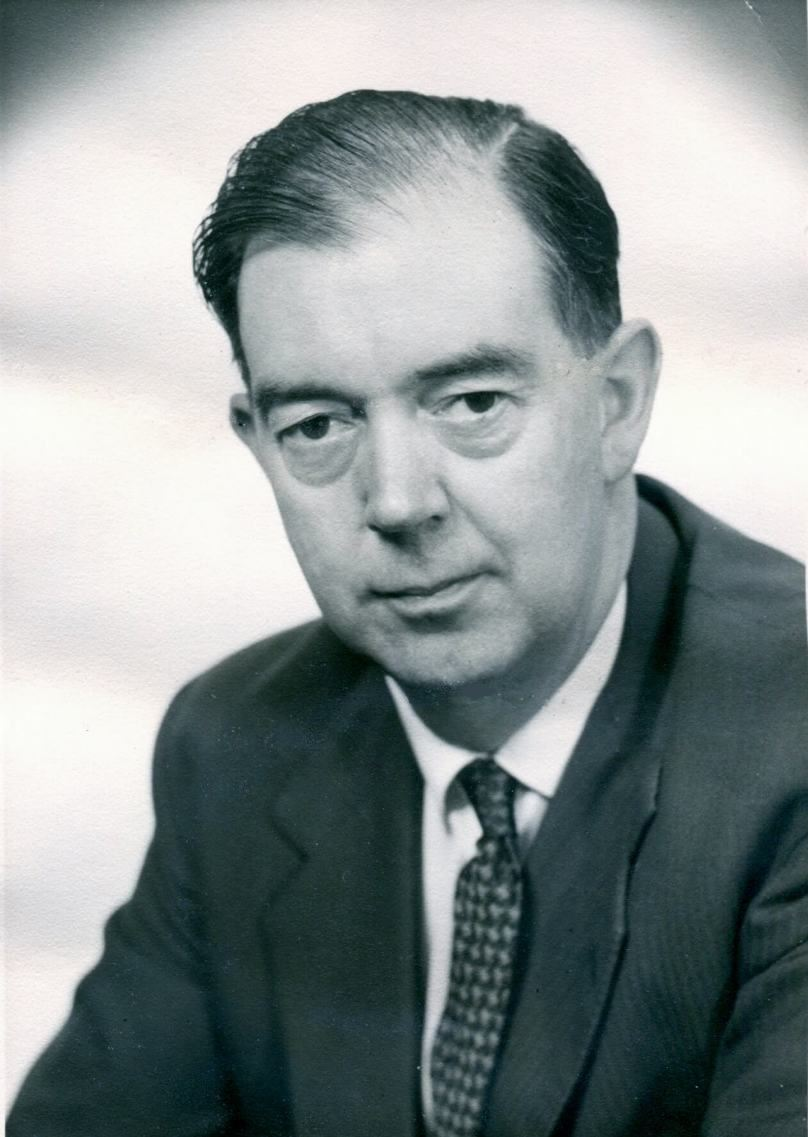
John Mills aged 54 in 1970

During the period from 1967 to 1976, Mills was the director of the Signals Research and Development Establishment (SRDE) in Christchurch in Dorset where he was responsible for three major technical research and development areas:

1. Night vision devices, mainly for the British Army where image intensifier technology was utilised in equipment from rifle sights to systems for tanks and other vehicles.
2. Tactical and strategic radio and communication network systems, some of which were in active service till the early 2000s e.g. Clansman from the late 1970s till 2004
3. Military satellite communication systems with emphasis on lightweight ground terminals for mobile use e.g. Ptarmigan

In 1971, Mills was appointed a Fellow of the Institution of Electrical Engineers (IEE), the highest grade of IEE membership.

== 1976–1977, RSRE ==
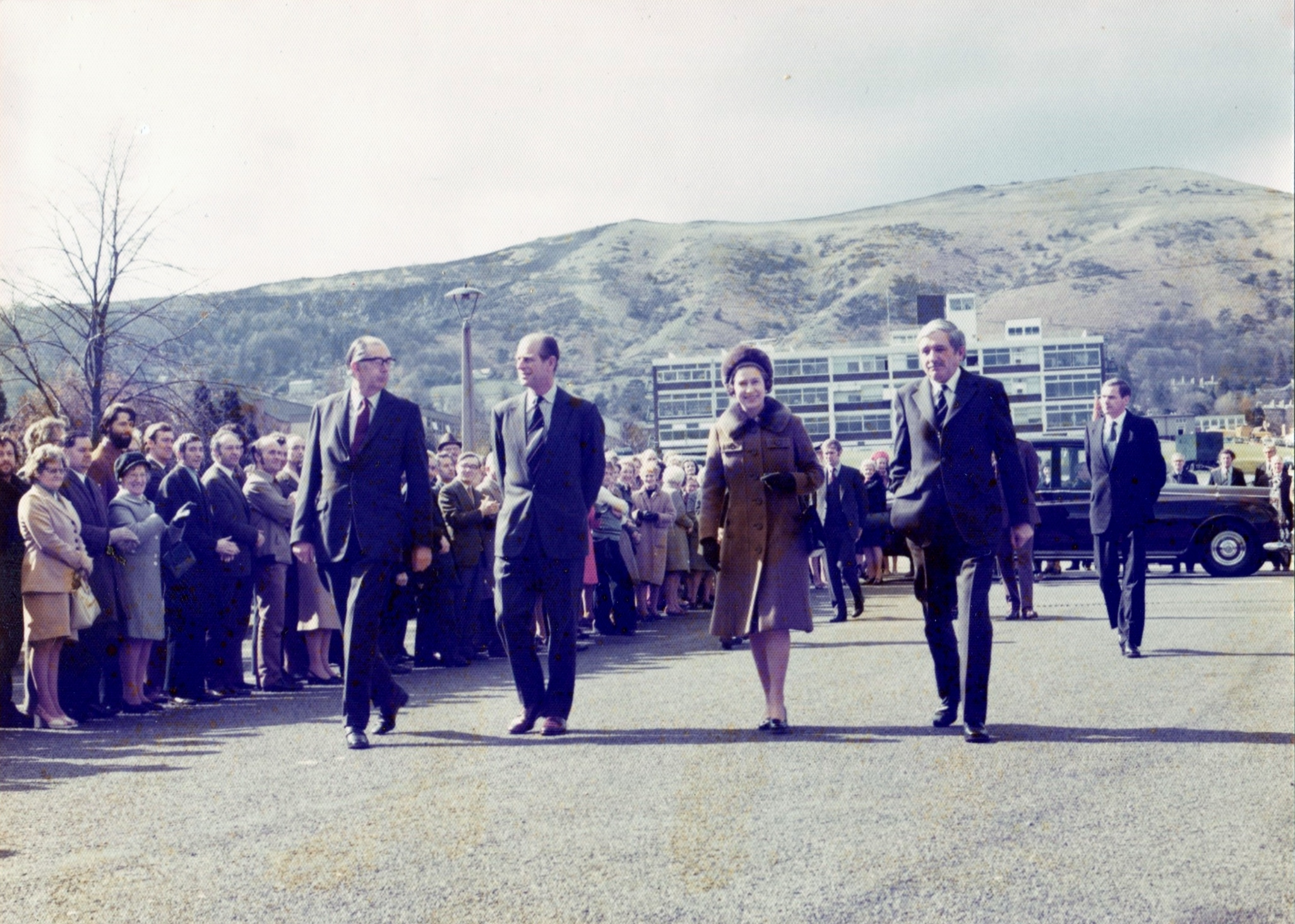
John Mills with the Queen and the Duke of Edinburgh at RSRE in 1976

The final chapter in Mills's career in the R&D business was a return to Malvern in 1976 as Deputy Director of the Royal Signals and Radar Establishment (RSRE), which had been formed by merging RRE, SRDE and SERL (Services Electronic Research Laboratory formerly at Baldock, Hertfordshire) as part of the programme to rationalise the defence establishments. His team continued to work on advanced military and satellite communications. Mills held this post until his retirement in 1977.

== Publications ==
Mills contributed to an article on radar published in the Encyclopædia Britannica

Mills published "Radio Techniques for Automatic Systems in the Air" in the Journal of Navigation in 1960

Mills jointly published "The Long-range Navigation of Civil Aircraft" in the Journal of Navigation in 1964

== Personal life ==
Mills married Pauline Phelps in April 1950. He was very much a family man with keen interests in music and gardening. He was survived by his wife and two sons.
