= ELLA (programming language) =

Programming language

- Developer: Royal Signals and Radar Establishment
- Release: 1986; 40 years ago
- Written in: ALGOL 68RS
- Operating system: VMS
- Platform: ICL 2900 Series, Multics, VAX
- Available in: English
- Type: Hardware description language
- License: public domain (parts)

ELLA is a hardware description language and support toolset, developed in the United Kingdom by the Royal Signals and Radar Establishment (RSRE) during the 1980s and 1990s, which also developed the compiler for the programming language, ALGOL 68RS, used to write ELLA.

ELLA has tools to perform:

- Design transformation
- Symbolic simulations
- Formal verification

ELLA is a winner of the 1989 Queen's Award for Technological Achievement.

== Sample ==
Sample originally from ftp://ftp.dra.hmg.gb/pub/ella, public release.

Code for matrix multiplication hardware design verification:

MAC ZIP = ([INT n]TYPE t: vector1 vector2) -> [n][2]t:
  [INT k = 1..n](vector1[k], vector2[k]).
     
MAC TRANSPOSE = ([INT n][INT m]TYPE t: matrix) -> [m][n]t:
  [INT i = 1..m] [INT j = 1..n] matrix[j][i].

MAC INNER_PRODUCT{FN * = [2]TYPE t -> TYPE s, FN + = [2]s -> s}
                 = ([INT n][2]t: vector) -> s:
  IF n = 1 THEN *vector[1]
  ELSE *vector[1] + INNER_PRODUCT {*,+} vector[2..n]
  FI.

MAC MATRIX_MULT {FN * = [2]TYPE t->TYPE s, FN + = [2]s->s} =
([INT n][INT m]t: matrix1, [m][INT p]t: matrix2) -> [n][p]s:
BEGIN
  LET transposed_matrix2 = TRANSPOSE matrix2.
OUTPUT [INT i = 1..n][INT j = 1..p]
       INNER_PRODUCT{*,+}ZIP(matrix1[i],transposed_matrix2[j])
END.

TYPE element = NEW elt/(1..20),
     product = NEW prd/(1..1200).

FN PLUS = (product: integer1 integer2) -> product:
  ARITH integer1 + integer2.

FN MULT = (element: integer1 integer2) -> product:
  ARITH integer1 * integer2.

FN MULT_234 = ([2][3]element:matrix1, [3][4]element:matrix2) ->
             [2][4]product:  
  MATRIX_MULT{MULT,PLUS}(matrix1, matrix2).

FN TEST = () -> [2][4]product:
( LET m1 = ((elt/2, elt/1, elt/1),
            (elt/3, elt/6, elt/9)), 
      m2 = ((elt/6, elt/1, elt/3, elt/4), 
            (elt/9, elt/2, elt/8, elt/3),
            (elt/6, elt/4, elt/1, elt/2)).
  OUTPUT
    MULT_234 (m1, m2)
).

COM test: just displaysignal MOC
