= Defence Research Agency (United Kingdom) =

Former executive agency in the UK

Agency overview
- Formed: 1 April 1991
- Preceding agencies: Admiralty Research Establishment; Royal Aircraft Establishment; Aeroplane and Armament Experimental Establishment; Royal Armament Research and Development Establishment; Royal Signals and Radar Establishment
- Dissolved: April 1995
- Superseding agency: Defence Evaluation and Research Agency
- Headquarters: Farnborough, Hampshire
- Parent agency: Ministry of Defence (United Kingdom)

The Defence Research Agency (DRA) was an executive agency of the UK Ministry of Defence (MOD) from April 1991 until April 1995. At the time, the DRA was Britain's largest science and technology organisation. In April 1995, the DRA was combined with five other MOD establishments to form the Defence Evaluation and Research Agency.

== History ==
The DRA was formed on 1 April 1991 as an amalgamation of the following Defence Research Establishments:

- Admiralty Research Establishment (ARE) – major sites Portsdown, Hampshire and Southwell, Dorset ("Maritime Division")
- Royal Aircraft Establishment (RAE) – major site Farnborough, Hampshire ("Aerospace Division")
- Aeroplane and Armament Experimental Establishment (A&AEE) – major site Boscombe Down
- Royal Armament Research and Development Establishment (RARDE) – major site Fort Halstead, Kent ("Military Division")
- Royal Signals and Radar Establishment (RSRE) – major site Malvern, Worcestershire ("Electronics Division")

DRA's headquarters was created at the RAE site at Farnborough, but the other major sites maintained a great deal of independence.

DRA's first Chief Executive was Nigel Hughes, followed by Sir John Chisholm who took over in August 1991.

In April 1995, the DRA was combined with five other MOD establishments to form the Defence Evaluation and Research Agency (DERA), DRA's John Chisholm becoming Chief Executive of the enlarged DERA (split in July 2001 into DSTL and QinetiQ).

== Bibliography ==
- Eds. Robert Bud and Philip Gummett (1999), Cold War Hot Science: Applied Research in Britain's Defence Laboratories 1945-1990, Harwood ISBN 90-5702-481-0
- Lake, A (1999). Flying units of the RAF. Shrewsbury: Airlife. ISBN 1-84037-086-6.
