= Negative luminescence =

Physical phenomenon

Negative luminescence is a physical phenomenon by which an electronic device emits less thermal radiation when an electric current is passed through it than it does in thermal equilibrium (current off). When viewed by a thermal camera, an operating negative luminescent device looks colder than its environment.

== Physics ==
Negative luminescence is most readily observed in semiconductors. Incoming infrared radiation is absorbed in the material by the creation of an electron–hole pair. An electric field is used to remove the electrons and holes from the region before they have a chance to recombine and re-emit thermal radiation. This effect occurs most efficiently in regions of low charge carrier density.

Negative luminescence has also been observed in semiconductors in orthogonal electric and magnetic fields. In this case, the junction of a diode is not necessary and the effect can be observed in bulk material. A term that has been applied to this type of negative luminescence is galvanomagnetic luminescence.

Negative luminescence might appear to be a violation of Kirchhoff's law of thermal radiation. This is not true, as the law only applies in thermal equilibrium.

Another term that has been used to describe negative luminescent devices is "Emissivity switch", as an electric current changes the effective emissivity.

== History ==
This effect was first seen by Russian physicists in the 1960s in A.F.Ioffe Physicotechnical Institute, Leningrad, Russia. Subsequently, it was studied in semiconductors such as indium antimonide (InSb), germanium (Ge) and indium arsenide (InAs) by workers in West Germany, Ukraine (Institute of Semiconductor Physics, Kyiv), Japan (Chiba University) and the United States. It was first observed in the mid-infrared (3-5 μm wavelength) in the more convenient diode structures in InSb heterostructure diodes by workers at the Defence Research Agency, Great Malvern, UK (now QinetiQ). These British workers later demonstrated LWIR band (8-12 μm) negative luminescence using mercury cadmium telluride diodes.

Later the Naval Research Laboratory, Washington, D.C., started work on negative luminescence in mercury cadmium telluride (HgCdTe). The phenomenon has since been observed by several university groups around the world.

== Patent ==
- U.S. patent 6,091,069, Ashley et al., July 18, 2000, Infrared optical system (Cold shield)
