= VIPER microprocessor =

32 bit microprocessor developed by RSRE

VIPER is a 32-bit microprocessor design created by Royal Signals and Radar Establishment (RSRE) in the 1980s, intended to be used in safety-critical systems such as avionics. It was the first commercial microprocessor design to be formally proven correct, although there was some controversy surrounding this claim and the definition of proof.

The design was completed in 1987 and implemented initially by RSRE in a gate array. Marconi Electronics subsequently licensed the design, implementing it as the MAS1908 VIPER-1, fabricated using CMOS and silicon-on-sapphire technologies, being packaged as a 120-pin grid array product.

Architecturally, VIPER is a 32-bit processor supporting 20-bit word-oriented addressing of memory and of "I/O space" (and thus 4 megabytes of each). Although employing a uniform instruction layout suggestive of RISC architectures, instruction execution times vary from 6 to 26 clock cycles, in contrast to a throughput of one instruction per cycle sought by conventional RISC architectures.

A safety critical programming language named Newspeak was designed by Ian Currie of RSRE in 1984 for use with VIPER. Its principal characteristic was that all exceptional behaviour in programs must be dealt with at compile time.
