= Signals Research and Development Establishment =

British military research establishment

Coordinates: 50.740°N 1.736°W

The Signals Research and Development Establishment (SRDE) was a British government military research establishment, based in Christchurch, Dorset from 1943 until it merged with the Royal Radar Establishment (RRE) in Malvern, Worcestershire to form the Royal Signals and Radar Establishment (RSRE) in 1976. Its focus was military communications (signals).

== History ==
=== 1914–1945: Early years ===
The establishment had its origins in the Royal Engineers Wireless Telegraphy Experimental Section founded at Aldershot in the very early part of the twentieth century. It moved to Woolwich, initially into the former Royal Dockyard (at that time a military stores depot) where it formed part of the Inspectorate of Royal Engineers Stores, before moving on to Woolwich Common.

In 1914 it was operating out of a van at Woolwich, but in 1916 it settled into its own premises, becoming the Signals Experimental Establishment. The establishment was renamed SRDE at the start of the Second World War; it moved briefly to Horsham before settling in Christchurch in 1943 after the radar teams left to Malvern. The Woolwich buildings then became part of the Atomic Weapons Research Establishment.

=== 1945–1960: Post-war Developments ===
Following World War II, the Signals Research and Development Establishment (SRDE) expanded its mission to include digital communication, transistors and computing. During the late 1940s and 1950s, SRDE became involved in the application of pulse-code modulation in British military systems, particularly for guided missile telemetry and radar data transmission. A major innovation in the 1950’s was the development of the Barker code, a binary sequence designed by SRDE engineer Ronald Hugh Barker in 1953 to improve synchronisation in PCM signal decoding.

=== 1960–1970: Satellites and merger ===
In the 1960s and 1970s SRDE was involved in the development of military communications satellites. It participated in the U.S. Interim Defense Communication Satellite Program (IDCSP), and a trans-Atlantic link to a U.S. station was first established on 18 June 1966. It also led the development of the British Skynet 1 and 2 military communications satellites, the first of which launched 22 November 1969, and performed their initial in-orbit testing. Skynet 1A was the first military satellite in geostationary orbit.

The Clansman radio system, the last wholly British range of military radios, was developed from SRDE technology in the 1960s. The system was used by the British Army from 1976 to the early 2000s, over a broad range of requirements, and introduced encryption.

In 1976, under the Director of John Mills, SRDE merged with the Royal Radar Establishment (RRE) and the Services Electronic Research Laboratory (SERL) to form the Royal Signals and Radar Establishment (RSRE), headquartered in Malvern, Worcestershire. SRDE remained in Christchurch until 1980, when it moved to a RSRE facility at RAF Defford near Malvern.

== Topics of research ==
- Satellite communications
- Battlefield communications
- Optical fibres
- Image intensifiers for night vision equipment
- Mine detectors (including non-metallic mines)
