= SPRITE infrared detector =

The SPRITE infrared detector is named after the process of signal integration carried out by "Signal Processing In The Element". The technique was invented at the Royal Signals and Radar Establishment at Malvern by a team of scientists including Tom Elliott.

The detector allows the build up of detected infrared signal in a mercury cadmium telluride (MCT) photoconductor strip, on a sapphire substrate, by applying a bias current through the strip. The detector is used in a scanned thermal imager and the bias voltage is adjusted to force electrons produced by the detected energy at one end of the strip to drift to the far end of the strip in time with the rate of the scanning such that energy from the same response is built up along the full length of the strip. This allows a much simpler way of integrating responses than linking separate detector cells.

This type of detector was used in a series of thermal imagers known as TICM (thermal imaging common modules). These modules were the mainstay of UK forces thermal imagers from the 1980s until their replacement by fully staring, two-dimensional-arrays detectors.

== See also ==
- Yellow Duckling
