= TREAC =

Early computer

TREAC or the TRE Automatic Computer was one of the first British computers, and in the world.

== History ==
TREAC was developed by a group led by Albert Uttley at the Telecommunications Research Establishment (TRE) in Worcestershire. The University of Manchester had been developing some of the first computers in the late 1940s and early 1950s. From 1947, the TRE in Worcestershire had been developing computers. The main part of the Manchester team had previously been at TRE. TRE had produced much of the electronics for the United Kingdom (for radar) during World War II, and came under the Ministry of Supply.

=== Development ===
TREAC was developed in the early 1950s. TREAC produced the first computer synthesised music. It ran its first computer program in 1953; from 1958 different sorts of computer programs could be written. All information was fed in and fed out on punched paper tape. TREAC was a bit-parallel computer, the first in the UK.

=== Closure ===
TREAC was switched off in 1962, and replaced with the Royal Radar Establishment Automatic Computer (RREAC, the UK's first solid state computer).

== See also ==
- Hollerith Electronic Computer
- SEAC (computer)
- SWAC (computer)
