= Portsdown =

Site of Special Scientific Interest in Hampshire, England

Coordinates: 50.854°N 1.092°W

- Site of Special Scientific Interest
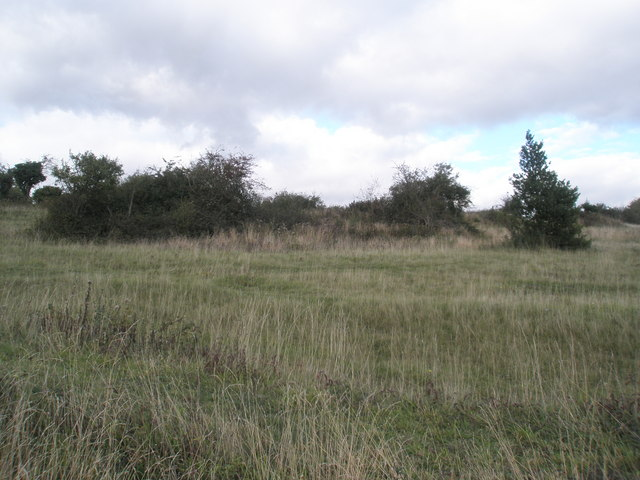
- Location of Portsdown.
- Area of search: Hampshire
- Grid reference: SU 640 065
- Interest: Biological
- Area: 69.1 hectares (171 acres)
- Notification date: 1984
- Location map: Magic Map

Portsdown is a 69.1-hectare (171-acre) biological Site of Special Scientific Interest on Portsdown Hill, on the northern outskirts of Portsmouth in Hampshire.

This is a linear south-facing escarpment with a rich chalk grassland flora. The diverse insect fauna includes all the chalk downland butterflies and a population of the largest British bush cricket, Tettigonia viridissima. On the lower slopes, raised beaches indicate former sea levels.
