= George G. Macfarlane =

British engineer

George Gray Macfarlane
- Born: 8 January 1916; Airdrie, North Lanarkshire
- Died: 20 May 2007 (aged 91)
- Known for: contribution to radar research

Sir George Gray Macfarlane (8 January 1916 – 20 May 2007) was a British engineer, scientific administrator and public servant.

He made major contributions to research on radar during World War II and received a special appointment as Superintendent, for theoretical work, within the Physics Division of the Telecommunications Research Establishment (TRE) during the post war years, continuing in this capacity when it was renamed the Royal Radar Establishment (RRE). He was appointed Deputy Director of the National Physical Laboratory in 1960, returned to RRE as Director in 1962 and was selected to be the first Controller of Research in the Ministry of Technology in 1967, responsible for the co-ordination of government laboratories with a total staff of 23,000.

In 1970 he was transferred to the Ministry of Defence, which had 20 research and development establishments. He consolidated these to just six, and was knighted in 1971. After retiring from this post in 1975, he continued several major professional activities.

== Early years ==
George Macfarlane was born in Airdrie, the youngest son of a grocer. Lanarkshire, and attended the Airdrie Academy. He entered the University of Glasgow in 1933, graduating in 1937, then went to the Dresden University of Technology, receiving a doctorate in July 1939, and leaving a month before the outbreak of war.

== Wartime research ==
Soon after the war started, Macfarlane joined the government laboratory that was developing radar and had moved to a site near Swanage in Dorset. The laboratory went through several name changes, and is best known during that period as the Telecommunications Research Establishment (TRE). He applied his strong mathematical skills to the electromagnetic theory of radio wave propagation and reflection, that was the basis of the defensive use of airborne radar in detecting and tracking hostile bombers. He participated in work on the counter measures against radar carried by enemy bombers to locate their targets, and then on work to make the radar carried by British bombers more effective. Shortly before the end of the war, he was attached to an intelligence unit with the advancing allied forces, to collect information on German radar.

== Postwar research ==
Developments in rocketry, that could propel missiles, and the discovery of semiconductors that were sensitive to infra red radiation led defence scientists and policy makers to focus on the development of heat seeking missiles. Under the direction of R.A. Smith, TRE became a major center for theoretical and experimental research on semiconductor physics. Macfarlane was given an individual merit post as Superintendent for theoretical work in the Physics Division. This included the applications of electromagnetic theory to antenna design and to the behaviour of magnetrons, of non-linear mathematics to guidance systems, of information theory to the filtration of radar signals, and of quantum mechanics to the electronic behaviour of crystalline solids. TRE merged with the Radar Research and Development Establishment (RRDE) to form the Radar Research Establishment (RRE) in 1953, renamed Royal Radar Establishment (also abbreviated RRE) in 1957. Macfarlane continued as Superintendent of Theoretical Physics throughout the reorganisations.

== The move to administration ==
In 1960, Macfarlane became Deputy Director of the National Physical Laboratory. This has a key role in providing standards for scientific measurements and performing numerical calculations. On his return to RRE as Director, two years later, he reorganised the technical departments into: Military and Civil Systems (comprising Ground Radar and Air Traffic Control, Guided Weapons and Airborne Radar groups), Physics and Electronics (comprising Physics and Electronic Groups) and Engineering. At this time, "despite the policy shift away from fighters ... to guided weapons for UK air defence, ... RRE continued to argue for strike aircraft and kept up the necessary radar research programs." In 1967, when Tony Benn was Minister of Technology, the post of Controller of Research was created in his ministry, and Macfarlane was appointed. Three years later, in 1970, he moved to the Ministry of Defence, planned and carried out a major restructuring and consolidation of its research activities, and was knighted.

== The years of retirement ==
Macfarlane retired officially in 1975, but continued to provide professional expertise in the public interest. He served on the committee that had been set up to plan the future of the telecommunications industry (the Carter Committee) and then on the Boards of the (British) Post Office and, later, British Telecom, advising on the use of digital communication and fibre optics. He also served on the National Enterprise Board, the Board of Trustees of the Imperial War Museum, the Council of the Fellowship of Engineering. He was elected Deputy President of the Institute of Electrical Engineers but declined the Presidency because the organisation would not accept a physics degree as the qualification for membership, despite the extent to which physics and electronic engineering overlapped.

In these activities, as in his earlier administrative roles, he was a unifier – of laboratories, of disciplines, and of industry, government and education. He was survived by his wife of 66 years, née Barbara Grant Thomson, and a son and a daughter.

== Honours and awards ==
- 1971 Knighted
- 1978 Glazebrook Medal from the Institute of Physics
