= Philip Gummett =

Philip John Gummett CBE is a British academic administrator.

Philip Gummett graduated from Birmingham University with a B.Sc. in chemistry in 1969. He graduated from Manchester University with the degrees of M.Sc. and Ph.D.

Gummett was Chief Executive of the Higher Education Funding Council for Wales from 2004 to 2012. While Chief Executive, Gummett drew up a new structure for Wales's universities. The resulting plan led to a series of high-profile mergers of higher education institutions in Wales.

Philip Gummett served as Pro Vice-Chancellor and Director of the PREST (Policy Research in Engineering, Science and Technology) institute at the University of Manchester. He was Professor of Government and Technology Policy at Manchester University. Gummett's best known academic work is the monograph Scientists in Whitehall (Manchester University Press, 1980).

Professor Gummett was appointed a Commander of the Order of the British Empire in the 2013 Birthday Honours for services to Higher Education in Wales.
