= John Chisholm (engineer) =

British engineer

Sir John Alexander Raymond Chisholm FREng CEng FIEE FRAeS FInstP (born 27 August 1946) is a British engineer who was chairman of the Medical Research Council and QinetiQ.

Chisholm was born in India of Scottish parents, Ruari Ian Lambert Chisholm and Pamela Harland Frank, and brought up in Calcutta. Mairi Chisholm was his great-aunt. He was educated at Worth School, and later attended Queens' College, Cambridge, reading Mechanical Sciences on a scholarship from General Motors. After completing his studies, he worked at GM from 1968 as a graduate apprentice before joining BP's computer consultancy firm Scicon in 1969. He joined leading systems house CAP and founded a divisional company within that group called CAP Scientific Ltd in 1979 of which he was managing director. In 1988, CAP merged with SEMA-METRA, a French company and the merged group was called Sema Group allowing it to trade in Europe where "CAP" was already used by an historical link with CAP-Gemini. SEMA-METRA was cash rich whereas CAP Group had a very strong order book. This allowed balancing of the new group's portfolio. In practice some would regard the move as a reverse takeover due to the relative strength of the French component of the company. Chisholm was UK managing director of Sema Group plc.

In 1991, Chisholm was asked by the UK Ministry of Defence to organize a number of their research organisations into a single entity, which eventually became the Defence Evaluation and Research Agency (DERA) - the largest science and technology organisation in the UK. In July 2001, three quarters of DERA was spun off to form a new private company called QinetiQ. In late 2005 Chisholm became Executive Chairman of QinetiQ, being replaced as CEO by Graham Love. According to The Sunday Times his annual pay was £467,000 in 2004. His £129,000 investment in the company was later worth £23m (a 17,829.5% return on investment, almost 180 times the initial value of the investment, which led to suggestions the company was undervalued). In 2008, the chairman of the House of Commons Public Accounts Committee accused Chisholm of "profiteering at the expense of the taxpayer". In response, Chisholm stated that the criticisms were "grossly unfair", and that "the reshaping of QinetiQ had been the greatest achievement of my working life". At that time, his stake was worth just over £21m. Further, in 2015 the chair of the UK's Public Administration Select Committee noted that "The UK had something the US needed and prized. Now that we no longer have the R&D capacity to produce many inventions, the mutual interest underpinning this relationship has dissipated, and the ‘special relationship’ is commensurately diminished. ... With less than two per cent of our defence budget spent on R&D, and following the destruction of DERA and with it much of the national R&D capability, we are generating very little technological invention."

Chisholm has been President of the Electrical Engineering Association. He was President and Trustee of the Institution of Engineering & Technology (formerly Institution of Electrical Engineers) (2005–2006). He was knighted in the 1999 New Year Honours. John is a Fellow of the Royal Academy of Engineering, the Royal Aeronautical Society, the Institute of Physics. He holds honorary Doctor of Engineering degrees from the Universities of Bath, Southampton and Brunel. He was a founding member of the British Government's Technology Foresight programme.

Appointed Chairman of the Medical Research Council by the Government, a position he took up in October 2006, he succeeded Sir Anthony Cleaver who had been in the post since 1998. Cleaver welcomed Chisholm's appointment stating him as a strong advocate for research. "Sir John's passion in promoting the value of research will be invaluable to the Medical Research Council as we enter a further period of change."

In 2007 the House of Commons Select Committee on Science and Technology, after describing him as vague and evasive in answering questions, said "we have serious reservations as to whether Sir John is the right person to guide the MRC Executive through the coming period of change". Despite his lack of medical qualifications, the Government refuted this statement saying that "Sir John has a first class background in business and has all the qualities and the perspective needed to chair the MRC Council successfully through this period of change...".

The Government also stated in response to the report by House of Commons Select Committee on Science and Technology that "The MRC is entering a period of change as the Centre's role in developing research evidence to support decision making in policy and practice was highlighted in the Cooksey report recommendations are put into effect. The new Chairman's career record—in particular his experience in managing change and translating research into marketable products—indicates that he should be well suited to a non-executive Chairman's role at this stage in the MRC's evolution."

Chisholm was appointed Chairman of NESTA (National Endowment for Science Technology and the Arts) on the first of November 2009.

In 2010, Chisholm retired from the QinetiQ board, being replaced as Chairman by Mark Elliott. He retired as MRC Chairman in September 2012, replaced by Donald Brydon.
