= Royal Signals and Radar Establishment =

Historic UK scientific research establishment

Coordinates: 52.100°N 2.316°W

The Royal Signals and Radar Establishment (RSRE) was a scientific research establishment within the Ministry of Defence (MoD) of the United Kingdom. It was located primarily at Malvern in Worcestershire, England. The RSRE motto was Ubique Sentio (Latin for "I sense everywhere").

== History ==
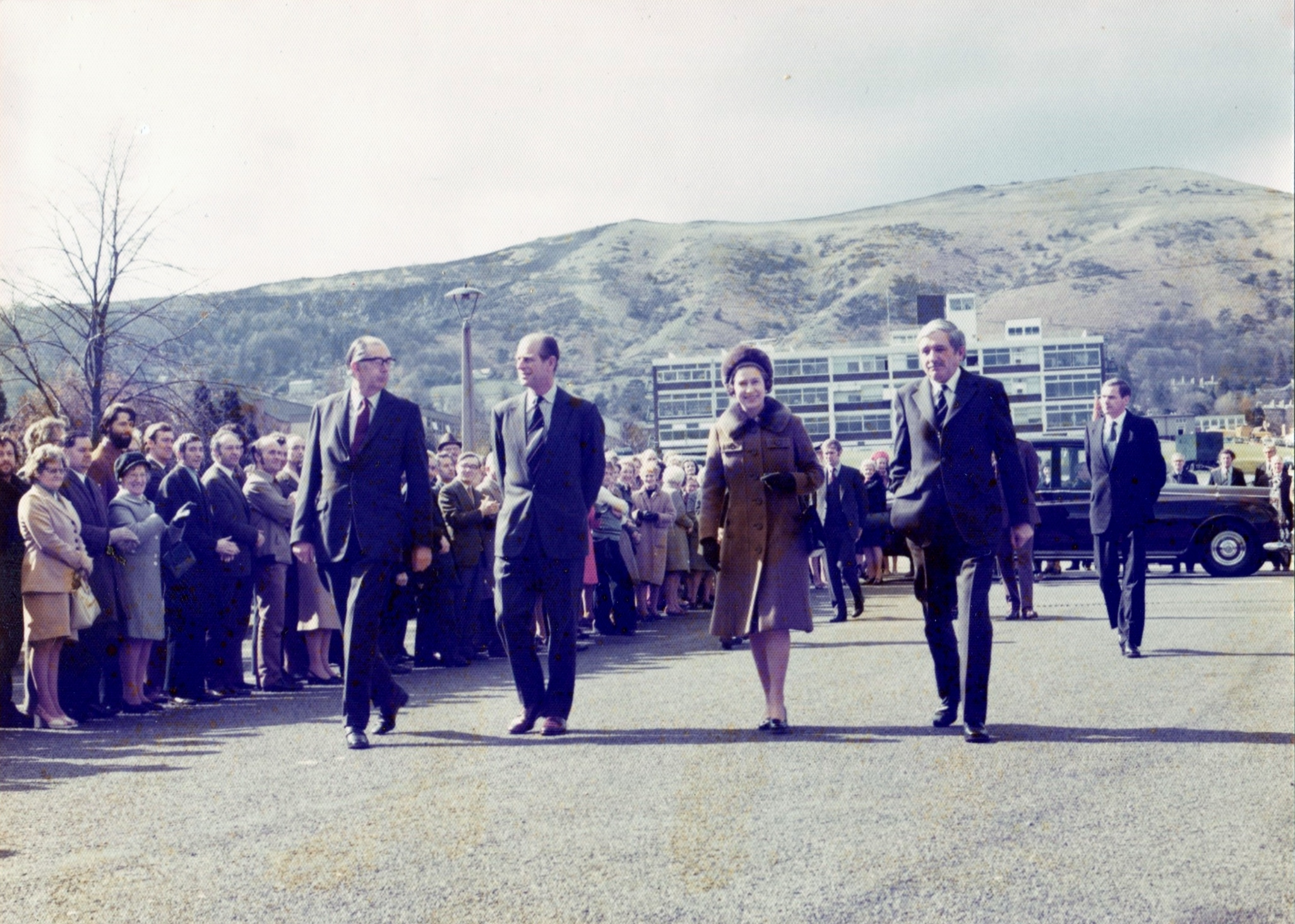
Queen Elizabeth II and Prince Philip visiting RSRE in 1976

RSRE was formed in 1976 by an amalgamation of previous research organizations; these included the Royal Radar Establishment (RRE), itself derived from the World War II-era Telecommunications Research Establishment, the Signals Research and Development Establishment (SRDE) in Christchurch, Dorset, and the Services Electronic Research Laboratory (SERL) at Baldock. "Costs were recovered from vote 2, the Treasury allocation to the Ministry of Defence for equipment, and ... was subject to cash limits within each tax year."

Beginning in 1979, the SRDE and SERL moved to Malvern to join the RRE's location. There were several out-stations in Worcestershire, including the ex-RAF airfields at Defford and Pershore and the satellite tracking station at Sheriffs Lench.

In April 1991 RSRE amalgamated with other defence research establishments to form the 'Next Steps' Defence Research Agency (DRA), with a trading fund based on commercial practice. In April 1995 the DRA amalgamated with more organisations to form the Defence Evaluation and Research Agency. In June 2001 this became independent of the MoD, with approximately two-thirds of it being incorporated into QinetiQ, a commercial company owned by the MoD, and the remainder into the fully government-owned laboratory DSTL. In 2003 the Carlyle Group bought a private equity stake (~30%) in QinetiQ.

== Research ==
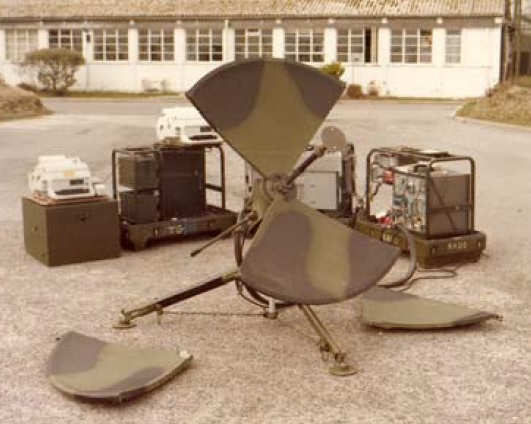
Portable satellite ground station built in the late 1970s by RSRE, primarily for use with Skynet 2B. Deployed in 1979 to support the peace-keeping operation in Rhodesia.

RSRE's activities included "research into fundamental and applied electronics, including displays, sensors and computing." Some of the most important technologies developed from work at RSRE are radar, satellite communications, thermography, liquid crystal displays, speech synthesis and the Touchscreen.

Predecessor organisation Signals Research and Development Establishment (SRDE) had been involved in the development of military communications satellites, within the U.S. Interim Defense Communication Satellite Program (IDCSP) and the development of the British Skynet 1 and 2 satellite types. The SRDE establishment moved to a RSRE facility at RAF Defford near Malvern in 1980, which had the benefit of flat terrain for good satellite dish positioning and the nearby Bredon Hill for satellite simulators. RSRE was involved in the design and testing of Skynet 4 and its ground facilities and terminals.

Contributions to computer science made by the RSRE included ALGOL 68RS (a portable implementation of ALGOL 68, following on from ALGOL 68R developed by RRE), Coral 66, radial basis function networks, hierarchical self-organising networks (deep autoencoders), the VIPER high-integrity microprocessor, the ELLA hardware description language, and the TenDRA C/C++ compiler.

RSRE was an early researcher of TCP/IP in Europe, along with Peter Kirstein's group at University College London and NDRE in Norway. The first email sent by a head of state was sent from the RSRE over the ARPANET by Queen Elizabeth II on 26 March 1976. RSRE was allocated class A Internet net 25 in 1979, which later became the Ministry of Defence address space, providing 16.7 million IPv4 addresses.

"This 'technology base' has fed work on complete systems, not only in RSRE but in most other defence establishments and in industry", the main ones being "airborne, battlefield and ground radar, optoelectronics, guided weapons, ground-based communications and air traffic control," but "it has mainly been known for its work on enabling technologies that can be applied to underpin systems development."
