= Defence Evaluation and Research Agency =

Former executive agency in the UK

Defence Evaluation Research Agency
Agency overview
- Formed: April 1995
- Preceding agencies: Defence Research Agency; Chemical and Biological Defence Establishment; Defence Test and Evaluation Organisation; Centre for Defence Analysis
- Dissolved: 2001
- Superseding agency: Defence Science and Technology Laboratory
- Jurisdiction: United Kingdom
- Headquarters: Farnborough, Hampshire, UK
- Agency executive: Sir John Chisholm, Chief Executive
- Parent agency: Ministry of Defence

The Defence Evaluation and Research Agency (DERA) was a part of the UK Ministry of Defence (MoD) between 1995 and 2 July 2001. At the time it was the United Kingdom's largest science and technology organisation. It was regarded by its official history as 'a jewel in the crown' of both government and industry. In 2015 the chair of the UK's Public Administration Select Committee noted that "The UK had something the US needed and prized. Now that we no longer have the R&D capacity to produce many inventions, the mutual interest underpinning this relationship has dissipated, and the 'special relationship' is commensurately diminished. ... With less than two per cent of our defence budget spent on R&D, and following the destruction of DERA and with it much of the national R&D capability, we are generating very little technological invention."

== Formation and operation ==
DERA was formed in April 1995 as an amalgamation of:

- Defence Research Agency (DRA) which was set up in April 1991 and comprised
  - Royal Aerospace Establishment (RAE)
  - Admiralty Research Establishment (ARE)
  - Royal Armament Research and Development Establishment (RARDE)
  - Royal Signals and Radar Establishment (RSRE)
- Defence Test and Evaluation Organisation (DTEO)
- Chemical and Biological Defence Establishment (CBDE at Porton Down), which became part of the Protection and Life Sciences Division (PLSD)
- Centre for Defence Analysis (CDA).

The organisation was a Next Steps Agency, operated as a trading fund. The chief executive throughout DERA's existence was John Chisholm. DERA's staffing level was around 9,000 scientists, technologists and support staff.

== Predecessor organisations ==
Predecessors included:

- Royal Naval Scientific Service
- Defence Research Information Centre
- Naval Scientific and Technical Information Centre

== Dissolution ==
DERA was split into two organisations, based on short-lived transition bodies known as PDERA ("privatised" DERA) - becoming a commercial firm, QinetiQ - and "RDERA" ( "retained" in Government DERA) - becoming the Defence Science and Technology Laboratory (Dstl).

At the split, QinetiQ was formed from the majority (about 3/4 of the staff and most of the facilities) of DERA, with Dstl assuming responsibility for those aspects which were best done in government. A few examples of the work undertaken by Dstl include nuclear, chemical, and biological research. In the time since the split both organisations have undergone significant change programmes. QinetiQ has increased its focus on overseas research with a number of US and other foreign acquisitions, whereas Dstl has a major rationalisation programme.
