= Five Nights at Freddy's (disambiguation) =

Five Nights at Freddy's is a survival horror video game franchise.

Five Nights at Freddy's can also refer to:

- Five Nights at Freddy's (video game), released in 2014 and was the first video game in the franchise
- Five Nights at Freddy's (song), a song based on the first video game in the franchise composed by The Living Tombstone
- Five Nights at Freddy's (film), a 2023 horror film based on the video game franchise

- Five Nights at Freddy's (soundtrack), the soundtrack for the 2023 film

- Five Nights at Freddy's 2 (video game), released in 2014 and was the second video game in the franchise
- Five Nights at Freddy's 2 (film), a 2025 horror film based on the video game franchise

== See also ==
- FNaF World, 2016 video game spin-off to the Five Nights at Freddy's series
