= Cupcake (disambiguation) =

Cupcake (also known as a "Fairy Cake") is a small, single-serving cake, usually frosted.

Cupcake may also refer to:

== Places ==
- Cupcake Peaks, a two rounded peaks, or nunataks, which rise to 1391 m 3 nautical miles (6 km) southeast of Mount Hamilton in Churchill Mountains
- Federal Prison Camp, Alderson or Camp Cupcake, a prison in the United States
- Johnson County, Kansas or Cupcake Land, a county in the central United States

== People ==
- Cupcake Brown, an author of memoir A Piece of Cake: A Memoir
- Cupcakke (born 1997), an American rapper
- Cupcake, the nickname of the President of South Africa, Cyril Ramaphosa

== Arts, entertainment, and media ==
- "Cupcake" (How I Met Your Mother), a 2006 television episode
- Cupcakes (band), a former power pop band from Chicago
- Cupcake Wars, a Food Network reality-based competition show
- "Cupcake", a song by Nellie McKay from the 2005 album Pretty Little Head
- Cupcake, a character from the Five Nights at Freddy's series
- Bad Cupcake, the working title for Five Nights at Freddy's
- Mr. Cupcake, a character in the animated series Adventure Time
- Cupcakes, an infamous work of My Little Pony: Friendship Is Magic fan fiction

== Computing and technology ==
- Android Cupcake, version 1.5 of the Android mobile operating system
- The Cupcake CNC fabber by MakerBot Industries

== Other uses ==
- Captain Cupcake, the second mascot for Hostess brand baked goods along with Twinkie the Kid
- Georgetown Cupcake, a cupcakery, located in the Georgetown neighborhood of Washington, D.C.
- Rosa 'SPIcup' or Rosa Cupcake, a miniature hybrid tea rose
- "I was actually coming out here to pick up a cupcake", a phrase associated with former YouTuber EDP445
