= Five Nights at Freddy's (soundtrack) =

Five Nights at Freddy's (Original Motion Picture Soundtrack)

Film score by the Newton Brothers
- Released: October 27, 2023
- Recorded: 2023
- Genre: Film score
- Length: 50:02
- Label: Back Lot Music
- Producer: The Newton Brothers

The Newton Brothers chronology
Goosebumps (2023)	Five Nights at Freddy's (2023)	X-Men '97 (2024)

Five Nights at Freddy's (Original Motion Picture Soundtrack) is the soundtrack to the 2023 film Five Nights at Freddy's based on the video game franchise of the same name created by Scott Cawthon. The soundtrack consisted of the score written, composed and produced by the Newton Brothers, and was released alongside the film on October 27, 2023, through Back Lot Music.

== Development ==
Tyler Bates was reported to compose music for the film during the initial stages of production, until he was replaced by the music composition team, Newton Brothers in September 2023. The director Emma Tammi, believed that the music was tonally blend with the creepiness and jumpscares in the film, and has been written in that way.

== Reception ==
The score received generally positive reviews. Los Angeles Times critic Jen Yamato called it as "pulsing", and Dani Kessel Odom of Screen Rant felt that it helped "enhance the creepy atmosphere of the film". Filmtracks.com summarised "At the end of the day, it's the main theme's primary performance that dominates the score for Five Nights at Freddy's. The rest of the work is adequately executed for its genre, and without the theme it may have stewed in the two-star range. That lovable title identity, however, elevates this soundtrack in memorability, even if the score and songs really should be appreciated together on album." In contrast, Murtada Elfadl of Variety criticised the music for being "loud and ominous" and has been heavily reliant to "manufacture thrills that are just not there". Frank Scheck of The Hollywood Reporter and Tim Grierson of Screen International called it "forgettable" and "loud".

== Track listing ==
Five Nights at Freddy's (Original Motion Picture Soundtrack) track listing
No.	Title	Length
1.	"Five Nights at Freddy's"	2:16
2.	"Delinquent Notice"	1:24
3.	"Mike's Dream Sequence I"	1:17
4.	"Mike's Dream Sequence II"	1:17
5.	"Aunt Jane"	0:45
6.	"Vanessa"	1:00
7.	"A Way In"	0:45
8.	"Chica's Mischief"	0:46
9.	"Foxy Fatality"	1:07
10.	"Family History"	3:22
11.	"Clean Up"	1:07
12.	"Fuzzy Friends"	2:50
13.	"Who Took Garrett?"	1:28
14.	"Follow the Yellow Rabbit"	1:49
15.	"Fuzzy on the Details"	0:59
16.	"Mike's Dream Sequence III"	5:51
17.	"Vannesa's Past"	5:25
18.	"Gear Up!"	0:54
19.	"Abby's in Danger"	1:59
20.	"The Yellow Rabbit"	2:26
21.	"Now I Kill You"	5:14
22.	"Doing Well"	2:05
23.	"The Rabbit Lives"	1:08
24.	"My Grandfather's Clock"	2:48
Total length:		50:02

== Additional music ==
In addition to the film's score, the following tracks are also featured in the film but not included on the soundtrack:

- "Video Games" by Guy Boulanger
- "Talking in Your Sleep" by the Romantics
- "Connection" by Elastica
- "Real Wild Child (Wild One)" by Iggy Pop
- "Celebration" by Kool & the Gang
- "I Wanna Be Down" by Brandy Norwood
- "Five Nights at Freddy's" by the Living Tombstone
