= Five Nights at Freddy's 2 (disambiguation) =

Five Nights at Freddy's 2 can refer to:

- Five Nights at Freddy's 2 (video game)
- Five Nights at Freddy's 2 (film), an upcoming 2025 film based on the video game
