= Five Nights at Freddy's: Help Wanted =

2019 video game

- Steam storefront header
- Developers: Scott Cawthon; Steel Wool Studios
- Publisher: Scott Cawthon
- Series: Five Nights at Freddy's
- Engine: Unreal Engine 4
- Platforms: PlayStation 4; Windows; Nintendo Switch; Oculus Quest; Android; iOS; Xbox One; PlayStation 5
- Release: May 28, 2019: PlayStation 4, Windows; May 28, 2019; Switch; May 21, 2020; Oculus Quest; July 16, 2020; Android, iOS; October 26, 2020; Xbox One; October 29, 2020; PlayStation 5; November 21, 2023
- Genre: Survival horror
- Mode: Single-player

Five Nights at Freddy's: Help Wanted (Note: Also known as Five Nights at Freddy's VR: Help Wanted) is a 2019 virtual reality (VR) survival horror game developed by Steel Wool Studios and Scott Cawthon. It is the eighth main installment in the Five Nights at Freddy's series, and is an anthology of minigames where the player must complete tasks without being attacked and killed by homicidal animatronic characters. These minigames include VR adaptations of the main Five Nights at Freddy's games, from the original game to Sister Location, and several new experiences. Hidden inside the levels are coins that unlock collectible objects and cassette tapes that provide insight into a metafictional narrative.

Cawthon initially approached Steel Wool Studios to recreate the first Five Nights at Freddy's (2014) in VR. He enjoyed their adaptation and decided to work with them to convert the rest of the series. Five Nights at Freddy's: Help Wanted was released on May 28, 2019, for Windows through Oculus Rift and HTC Vive, and for PlayStation 4 through PlayStation VR.

Help Wanted received generally positive reviews from critics, who called it accessible and tense, though some found the jumpscares repetitive. A non-VR port to Nintendo Switch received mixed reviews. A downloadable content expansion, Curse of Dreadbear, was released on October 23, 2019. A sequel, Five Nights at Freddy's: Help Wanted 2, was released on December 14, 2023.

== Gameplay ==
A screenshot depicting the camera system featured in the minigame adaptation of Five Nights at Freddy's 1

Five Nights at Freddy's: Help Wanted is a virtual reality (VR) survival horror game. It is an anthology of different minigames where the player must perform tasks without being caught and jumpscared by homicidal animatronic characters. The minigames include recreations of the main Five Nights at Freddy's games, chronologically from the first Five Nights at Freddy's (2014) to Sister Location (2016), and several scenarios unique to Help Wanted. Most minigames contain security cameras to monitor the animatronics and other tools to prevent them from catching the player. Tools include steel doors, lights, and a mask that allows the player to avoid detection. If a player loses one of the minigames, they are jumpscared and receive a game over.

Completing each level grants access to an alternate, more difficult variant featuring warped graphics. In addition to adaptations of the main Five Nights at Freddy's games, new experiences include: "Parts and Service", where the player performs maintenance on the animatronics without provoking a jumpscare; "Vent Repair", where the player solves puzzles to fix a ventilation shaft while keeping threats at bay; and "Dark Rooms", in which the player shines a flashlight with limited power to catch the animatronics. The player may optionally collect gold coins or cassette tapes hidden inside the levels; coins are used to obtain collectible objects, and the cassette tapes provide background information on the plot.

== Plot ==
In the metafictional narrative, the player controls a user of the "Freddy Fazbear Virtual Experience", a VR game developed by Fazbear Entertainment, the corporation managing the Freddy Fazbear restaurants and brand. The company's reputation has suffered due to violent incidents at their restaurants, which have become established urban legends. The problem is aggravated by a horror video game series based on the legends created by an unnamed indie developer. To improve its image, Fazbear Entertainment commissioned the game to convince the public that the events were fictitious.

This narrative is contradicted by sixteen cassette tapes, through which the user is given insight into the game's troubled development. Meant as a warning for players, they are covertly recorded by one of the playtesters, who exposes a lawsuit involving a past employee of Fazbear Entertainment, Jeremy, that put the game's completion in jeopardy. Later recordings reveal that Fazbear Entertainment hired the unnamed indie developer to create the video game series based on the urban legends before cutting ties with him; the games were part of an elaborate ploy to discredit rumors surrounding the company. Lastly, the tapes disclose the existence of malware that was uploaded through an old printed circuit board. This code takes the form of a rabbit-like character called Glitchtrap, who is attempting to escape from the game by taking over the user's consciousness.

Five Nights at Freddy's: Help Wanted contains several endings dependent on the player's choices. These endings include the user having their consciousness taken over by Glitchtrap, another where they complete all the levels and witness the credits while performing on-stage as Freddy Fazbear, and an ending where the player follows instructions stated in the tapes and is locked behind a steel door, where Glitchtrap shushes the user before disappearing behind the edifice.

== Development and release ==
Five Nights at Freddy's: Help Wanted was developed in collaboration between Steel Wool Studios and the Five Nights at Freddy's creator Scott Cawthon. It received further support from Lionsgate Games and Striker Entertainment. Cawthon initially approached Steel Wool Studios to help recreate the original Five Nights at Freddy's in VR. Steel Wool finished an initial conversion, but felt it was too barebones and could be improved. The animations for Cawthon's characters had to be updated to look convincing and scary in a 3D environment, and the team added finer details to their character designs. Cawthon liked the adaptation so much that he expanded his initial plan, now working with Steel Wool to recreate all previous Five Nights at Freddy's games.

An announcement trailer was shown during Sony Interactive Entertainment's State of Play livestream on March 25, 2019. The game debuted publicly at PAX East from March 28 to March 31, 2019, and was available at subsequent PlayStation VR demonstrations. Promotional artwork released as part of a teaser had to be replaced afterward, as it was found to contain character models based on fan art. Cawthon issued an apology, saying that the person responsible for the images confused the fan-made models with official designs.

Help Wanted was announced for release in April 2019, but was released on May 28, 2019, for Oculus Rift and HTC Vive headsets on Windows, and PlayStation VR headsets on PlayStation 4. A non-VR version, "flat mode", was released for Windows and PlayStation 4 on December 17, 2019. Ports for other consoles and platforms followed throughout 2020, including for Nintendo Switch on May 21, Oculus Quest on July 16, Android and iOS on October 26, and Xbox One on October 29. Halloween-themed downloadable content (DLC), Curse of Dreadbear, was released on October 23, 2020, and additional levels for the DLC were added on October 29. Curse of Dreadbear was released on all platforms except for Oculus Quest, for which it was not released until December. An updated version containing Curse of Dreadbear, Five Nights at Freddy's: Help Wanted – Full Time Edition, was released for PlayStation 5 with PlayStation VR2 support on November 21, 2023.

== Reception ==
Reception

Aggregate score
Aggregator	Score
Metacritic	PS4: 80/100; NS: 53/100

Review scores
Publication	Score
Destructoid	PS4: 9/10
HobbyConsolas	PS4: 73/100
Nintendo Life	NS: 3/10
The Games Machine (Italy)	PS4: 8.6/10
IGN Italia	PS4: 8.3/10

The PlayStation 4 version of Five Nights at Freddy's: Help Wanted received "generally favorable reviews" according to the review aggregator website Metacritic; the Nintendo Switch version received "mixed or average reviews". The game was nominated for the Coney Island Dreamland Award for Best AR/VR Game at the New York Game Awards in 2020.

Reviewers found Help Wanted accessible. Destructoid felt that longtime fans and those unfamiliar with the series would enjoy it, while The Games Machine wrote that players previously not fans of the horror genre would be appeased because of Help Wanted's simple mechanics. UploadVR said that the game was a "masterclass in suspense", and IGN Italia called it one of the scariest VR horror games.

Critics called Help Wanted tense and unsettling. UploadVR found the atmosphere intriguing, saying that it increasing the impact of jumpscares, and that VR made the game captivating. Vandal said the experience was stressful, and praised the designs of the animatronics as detailed and intimidating. IGN Italia said the game created compelling tension that made the player feel vulnerable. Some reviewers called the jumpscares effective, but felt they became repetitive over time.

Reviewers focused on the minigames. Destructoid praised their inclusion and appreciated that the creators made new experiences beyond recreating the main Five Nights at Freddy's games, highlighting Vent Repair and Dark Rooms as particularly enjoyable. IGN Italia also enjoyed Vent Repair and added that the minigames had significant replay value. The Games Machine felt that they created gameplay diversity, but that some of the minigames retained the flaws of the original games. They found the quality of the original Help Wanted minigames mixed. UploadVR said the game became repetitive despite the number of levels, finding that their simple mechanics did not sustain the experience.

Some critics found the Nintendo Switch port inferior to the VR versions. Kotaku and Nintendo Life found the controls slow and difficult, and wrote that the game lacked the immersion of VR. Nintendo Life said that many of the minigames were worse versions of the Five Nights at Freddy's games already available for Switch. Kotaku liked the new experiences such as the Vent Repair and Parts and Service minigames, but said Help Wanted did not justify replaying the main Five Nights at Freddy's games.

== Sequel ==
Five Nights at Freddy's: Help Wanted 2 was announced on May 24, 2023, during a PlayStation Showcase. A PlayStation Blog post by Steel Wool Studios on November 20, 2023, announced a release for PlayStation VR2 on December 14, 2023, and disclosed many of the minigames. The game was launched on that date for Oculus Quest and PlayStation VR2, and Steel Wool Studios released a non-VR port of Help Wanted 2 for PlayStation 5 on June 20, 2024. The minigames in Help Wanted 2 are based on experiences from Sister Location and Security Breach, and include a shooting gallery and various arcade-style games. The story has multiple endings, and some levels can only be accessed by completing a puzzle involving the narrative.
