= HW2 =

HW2 may refer to:

- Homeworld 2, a 2003 video game
- Halo Wars 2, a 2017 video game
- Five Nights at Freddy's: Help Wanted 2, a 2023 virtual reality game
