= Rosa 'Cupcake' =

Rose cultivar

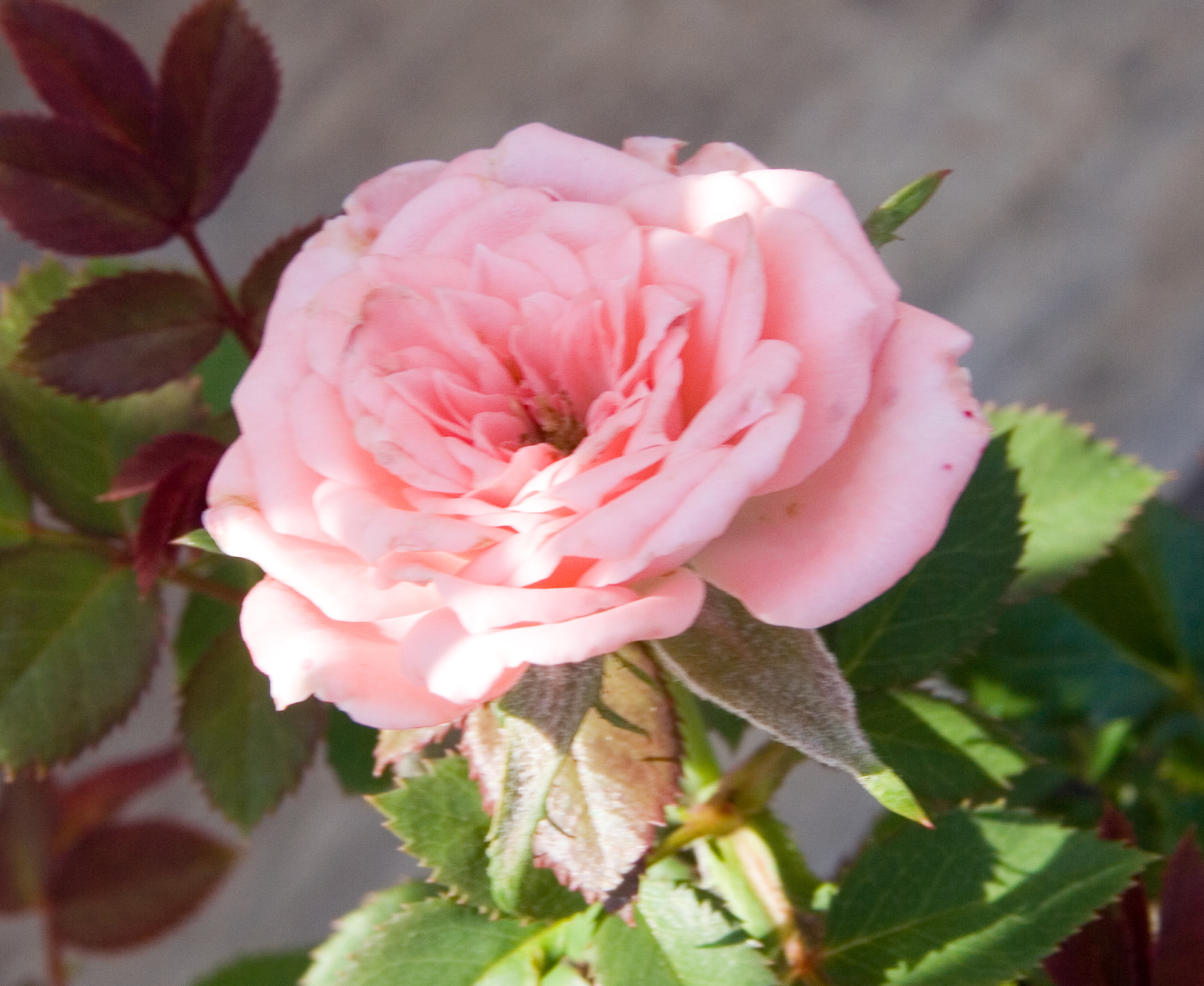
- Genus: Rosa hybrid
- Hybrid parentage: 'Rosa 'Gene Boerner' x ('Gay Princess' x 'Yellow Jewel')
- Cultivar group: Miniature rose
- Cultivar: 'SPICup'
- Breeder: Spies
- Origin: United States, 1981.

Rosa 'Cupcake' (aka SPIcup) is a miniature rose, bred by Mark Spies in 1981. The cultivar was the winner of an American Rose Society Award of Excellence in 1983.

== Description ==
'Cupcake' is a compact, bushy shrub, 1 to 2 ft (30–60 cm) in height with a 1 to 2 ft (30–60 cm) spread. Blooms are 2–3 in (5–7 cm) in diameter, high-centered with a double (17–25 petals) bloom form. The flowers are a clear, pretty pink, darker pink in cool weather and paler pink in warmer weather. Blooms have a light, sweet scent. The flowers are borne singly or in small clusters and last a long time. The plant is a good repeater, and blooms continuously from spring through fall. The foliage is glossy and gray-green. The plant does well in USDA zone 5 and warmer. 'Cupcake' is a good container rose.
