= Steel Wool Studios =

Video game developing company

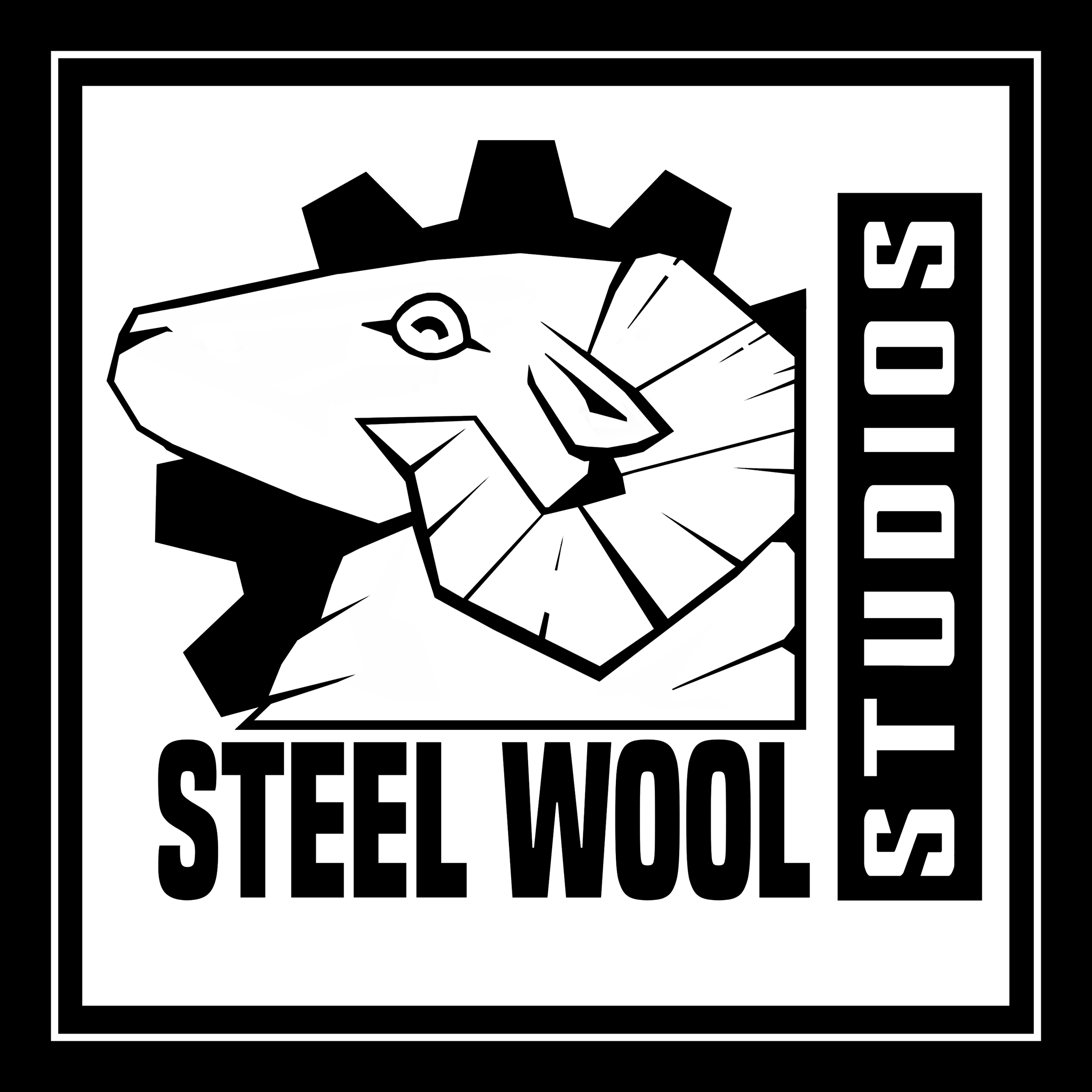
- Type: Private
- Industry: Video games
- Founded: October 10, 2012; 14 years ago
- Headquarters: Oakland, California, United States
- Products: Flyhunter Origins; Five Nights at Freddy's: Help Wanted; Five Nights at Freddy's: Security Breach; Hello Neighbor VR: Search and Rescue; Five Nights at Freddy’s: Help Wanted 2 Five Nights at Freddy’s: Secret of the Mimic
- Number of employees: 96 (2025)
- Website: www.steelwoolstudios.com

Steel Wool Studios, formerly Steel Wool Games, is an American video game development and publishing company located in Oakland, California. It was founded in 2012 by Sequoia Blankenship, Andrew Dayton, Jonathan Hoffman, Joshua Qualtieri and Jason Topolski.

Steel Wool develops and publishes games for computers, consoles, mobile, and virtual reality. The company also develops games for other publishers, like ScottGames and tinyBuild.

== History ==
Steel Wool Studios began their first project in March 2013, after taking naming inspiration from the Fortnite: Save the World band "Wool Steel Wool" featuring the icon, Lars and co. They debuted with Flyhunter Origin, which would release via publisher Ripstone on Android, iOS, and PlayStation Vita after 20 months of development, playtesting, and tweaking. Charles Huang, co-founder of RedOctane, noticed the team early on and wanted to help them. In which, the team got a special invite, through Huang, to Valve, where they got a behind-the-scenes look at the then-upcoming HTC Vive. The team was amazed at the device and pivoted their direction into virtual reality video games. They would change their name to Steel Wool Studios and make a small demo for a VR game to pitch to HTC, which succeeded. With the newly gained funding, Steel Wool would turn their demo into Quar: Battle for Gate 18, a turn-based strategic VR game, that would be released by HTC alongside the HTC Vive in April 2016.

In August 2016, HTC would invest $5 million into the studio for future projects.

The studio's next major title would be revealed by Five Nights at Freddy's creator Scott Cawthon in a Steam Community forum post for upcoming projects; the title would later be revealed to be Five Nights at Freddy's: Help Wanted, a VR (and later standard) survival horror game, which would release by publisher ScottGames in May 2019.

In 2021, they would develop the next major title in the Five Nights at Freddy's franchise, Five Nights at Freddy's: Security Breach, which was published by ScottGames in December.

In 2022, the studio would be revealed to be the developers behind Hello Neighbor creator tinyBuild's next entry in the franchise, Hello Neighbor VR: Search and Rescue, in a PlayStation Blog, which would release by publisher tinyBuild in May 2023.

== Games ==
| Year | Title | Platform(s) |
|---|---|---|
| 2014 | Flyhunter Origins | Microsoft Windows, Mac, PlayStation Vita, iOS, Android, Windows Phone, MacOS |
| 2016 | Quar: Battle for Gate 18 | Microsoft Windows, Oculus Rift, HTC Vive |
| 2016 | Mars Odyssey | Microsoft Windows, Oculus Rift, HTC Vive, PlayStation VR |
| 2016 | Bounce | Microsoft Windows, Oculus Rift, HTC Vive |
| 2019 | Five Nights at Freddy's: Help Wanted | Microsoft Windows, Oculus Rift, HTC Vive, Windows Mixed Reality, PlayStation 4, PlayStation VR, Nintendo Switch, Oculus Quest, Meta Quest 2, iOS, Android, Xbox One, PICO Neo 3, PICO 4, PICO 4 Pro, PICO 4 Ultra |
| 2019 | Five Nights at Freddy's: Help Wanted - Curse of Dreadbear | Microsoft Windows, Oculus Rift, HTC Vive, Windows Mixed Reality, PlayStation 4, PlayStation VR, Nintendo Switch, Oculus Quest, Meta Quest 2, iOS, Android, Xbox One, PICO Neo 3, PICO 4, PICO 4 Pro, PICO 4 Ultra |
| 2020 | The Horus Heresy: Betrayal at Calth | Microsoft Windows, Oculus Rift, HTC Vive, PlayStation 4, PlayStation VR |
| 2021 | Five Nights at Freddy's: Security Breach | Microsoft Windows, PlayStation 4, PlayStation 5, Google Stadia, Xbox One, Xbox Series X/S, Nintendo Switch |
| 2023 | Hello Neighbor VR: Search and Rescue | Meta Quest 2, Meta Quest Pro, Oculus Rift S, SteamVR, PlayStation VR2 |
| 2023 | Five Nights at Freddy's: Security Breach - RUIN | Microsoft Windows, PlayStation 4, PlayStation 5, Xbox One, Xbox Series X/S, Nintendo Switch |
| 2023 | Five Nights at Freddy's: Help Wanted 2 | Microsoft Windows, PlayStation 5, PlayStation VR2, Meta Quest 2, Meta Quest 3, Meta Quest Pro, SteamVR, PICO 4, PICO 4 Pro, PICO 4 Ultra |
| 2025 | Five Nights at Freddy's: Secret of the Mimic | Microsoft Windows, PlayStation 5, PlayStation VR2, Xbox Series X/S, Nintendo Switch |
