= Five Nights at Freddy's: Security Breach =

2021 video game

- Developer: Steel Wool Studios
- Publisher: ScottGames
- Director: Jason Topolski
- Producer: Chase Behl
- Designer: Brian Freyermuth
- Writers: Jason Topolski; Madison Petrick
- Composer: Allen Simpson
- Series: Five Nights at Freddy's
- Engine: Unreal Engine 4
- Platforms: PlayStation 4; PlayStation 5; Windows; Stadia; Xbox One; Xbox Series X/S; Nintendo Switch
- Release: December 16, 2021: PlayStation 4, PlayStation 5, Windows; December 16, 2021; Stadia; July 1, 2022; Xbox One, Xbox Series X/S; November 22, 2022; Switch; April 19, 2023
- Genre: Survival horror
- Mode: Single-player

Five Nights at Freddy's: Security Breach is a 2021 survival horror game developed by Steel Wool Studios and published by ScottGames. It is the ninth main installment in the Five Nights at Freddy's series. Set in a large entertainment complex, the player takes on the role of a young boy named Gregory, who must evade the complex's hostile animatronic mascots as well as the night guard, attempting to survive until the morning. The game features significant differences from other installments in the franchise, with primary differences including free-roam gameplay.

The game was first announced in 2020 during the PlayStation 5 Showcase event, and was released for Microsoft Windows, PlayStation 4, and PlayStation 5 on December 16, 2021, for Xbox One and Xbox Series X/S on November 22, 2022, and for Nintendo Switch on April 19, 2023. A free downloadable content expansion, Ruin, was released in July 2023. Security Breach received mixed reviews from critics, with praise towards the atmosphere and visual design, but criticism towards the gameplay and technical performance.

== Gameplay ==
The player in the day-care playground hiding from Moon, the villain personality of the Daycare Attendant, the body of whom Moon, Sun, and Eclipse all share

Five Nights at Freddy's: Security Breach is a survival horror game with stealth elements. In the game, the player takes control of a young boy named Gregory, who is locked inside "Freddy Fazbear's Mega Pizzaplex", a large entertainment complex that the player is free to explore. While locked inside, the player must survive from midnight to 6:00 a.m. while fending off several animatronic mascots and robots that attempt to kill them. The complex and animatronics are modeled after a 1980s glam rock style. Gregory will also encounter other types of enemies, such as the night guard Vanessa.

Unlike previous iterations where Freddy is a prominent antagonist, in Security Breach, Freddy helps the player evade the other animatronics and features a stomach compartment that the player is able to hide in. However, as a result of malfunctions, Freddy can run out of power and must be recharged, forcing the players to fend for themselves. A variety of different tools are available to the player besides Freddy, such as a network of security cameras accessible via the players' watch, weapons such as the "Fazerblaster"—a laser gun with limited ammo that restores over time—and the "Faz Cam"—a camera-like stun device—as well as environmentally based ways to deterring the animatronics, such as knocking over objects to create a distraction that lures away animatronics. When the time reaches 6:00 a.m., the player is able to leave the Pizzaplex and complete the game, with the ending the player receives being dependent on choices they make throughout the game.

== Plot ==
Five Nights at Freddy's: Security Breach takes place in a massive entertainment complex known as Freddy Fazbear's Mega Pizzaplex, which has animatronic mascots, Glamrock Freddy, Glamrock Chica, Montgomery "Monty" Gator, and Roxanne "Roxy" Wolf. As the animatronics perform for an audience at the complex, Freddy suddenly suffers a malfunction and breaks down on stage, ending the performance. Afterwards, he is taken to Rockstar Row and discovers that a young boy named Gregory is hiding inside his stomach compartment. After the discovery, Vanessa, a female security guard and the only human on staff for the night, orders all animatronics and staff bots—most of which have become aggressive for unknown reasons—to search for Gregory.

As a result of the malfunction and his fear of Vanessa, Freddy disobeys her orders and instead guides Gregory to the lobby to help him escape, only for the complex to lock up for the night and trap him inside until they reopen in the morning. Until the complex reopens, Freddy helps Gregory survive the night and guides him through the Pizzaplex. After the two elude Vanessa and the animatronics and take refuge in a security office, Gregory manages to gain access to the complex's surveillance system. To obtain access to certain parts of the complex, Gregory attempts to acquire high-level security badges from the complex's daycare, encountering the Daycare Attendant in his "Sun form". Whilst in the daycare, a power outage forces Gregory to confront Sun's hostile alter ego, Moon. He manages to restore its power, but the Attendant (as Sun) kicks Gregory out for turning the lights off. It proceeds to then alert the animatronics of his location before he is rescued by Freddy.

Shortly afterwards, Gregory is captured by Vanessa and is later confined in a party room. Vanny—a woman in a white patchwork rabbit costume—approaches him, but he escapes and reunites with Freddy. The two venture into the basement, where Moon ambushes them and captures Freddy. Gregory proceeds throughout the basement and avoids the animatronic endoskeletons, before finding Freddy being interrogated by Vanessa, accusing him of colluding with Gregory. Gregory repairs Freddy after Vanessa leaves, and begins dismantling the other animatronics to use their parts to upgrade Freddy.

Shortly after the upgrades are completed, 6:00 a.m. arrives and the complex's doors open, but Vanessa requests Gregory to meet her for a "reward", which is several different recordings of Vanessa and an unknown person undergoing therapy. Gregory is then left with the choice of leaving the complex, staying to continue exploring the complex's secrets and trying to solve the remaining mysteries, or confronting Vanny, who was also responsible for several missing children cases within the complex.

The game has six different endings, each of which depends on Gregory's actions throughout the game and how he exits the complex. One ending in particular—known as the "Burntrap" ending–results in a boss fight against an animatronic named Burntrap before he is ultimately defeated by Gregory. It also reveals the remnants of a past Freddy Fazbear's Pizza location that was buried beneath the complex years ago. Another ending—known as the "Princess Quest" ending—results in Gregory learning that Vanessa and Vanny are the same person. After a final confrontation in Fazer Blast, Gregory manages to save Vanessa, and together with her and Freddy, leave the complex as the sun begins to come up.

=== Ruin ===
Some time after the events of the main story, Gregory becomes trapped within the Pizzaplex—now abandoned—once again, this time by an unknown entity beneath. To free him, his friend Cassie arrives and collects different items around the complex. These items include a security mask, which allows her to access a Virtual Augmented Neural Network Integration ("V.A.N.N.I.") unit. Gregory guides Cassie through the Pizzaplex and instructs her to disable several security nodes in order to access a sinkhole, with the last one being a now-blinded Roxanne "Roxy" Wolf which Cassie tearfully disables. As she goes through the complex, Cassie encounters damaged versions of the complex's animatronics, in which she fries Monty with a neon bonnie sign, repairs Chica using her voicebox, encounters damaged versions of the Music Men and a prototype Glamrock Freddy, and fuses the Attendant's Sun and Moon forms into an "Eclipse". She is also hunted by a digital entity in the form of a rabbit whenever she is wearing the security mask.

After disabling Roxy, a distressed Cassie makes her way into the sinkhole and the remnants of Freddy Fazbear's Pizza. She disables the security protocols of the location, and shuts down a program named M.X.E.S. (the server for the rabbit entity). When she enters the room Gregory was trapped in, she instead discovers a skeletal animatronic known as the "Mimic", who is using Gregory's vocal patterns to trick Cassie into releasing him. The Mimic chases after Cassie as the real Gregory leads her to an elevator, with the Mimic overpowering a rebooted Roxy in the process.

As the elevator ascends, Gregory reveals that the Mimic was trapped in the sinkhole for some time, and M.X.E.S. was built to stop it from escaping. Since Cassie shut down the security nodes and M.X.E.S., the Mimic is now free. Though Gregory appreciates Cassie risking her life for him, he tells her that he cannot allow the Mimic to be freed. Gregory apologetically disables the elevator, sending the car plummeting to the ground with Cassie still inside, where she is found by Roxy. An alternate ending can also be acquired where the Mimic is defeated by Cassie via a device that grabs it and shuts it down.

== Development and release ==
Security Breach was developed by Steel Wool Studios and Scott Cawthon. It was first announced on September 16, 2020, when a teaser trailer for the game was released during the PlayStation 5 Showcase event. At the end of the presentation, it was announced that the game would be released on PC, PlayStation 4, and PlayStation 5, and could come to other platforms at a later date. However, on November 17, Cawthon announced that, due to the COVID-19 pandemic and new additions to the game, the game had been delayed to early 2021. The game was delayed further in April 2021, aiming for a release date later that year instead.

In June 2021, Cawthon was discovered to have donated to Republican Party politicians, prompting a controversy on social media. As a result of the controversy, Cawthon announced that he would be retiring from game development and someone else would be "running the show"; Steel Wool Studios continued to develop the game. During the PlayStation State of Play on October 27, 2021, the final trailer was showcased, revealing the game's release date to be December 16, 2021. On February 28, 2022, an update was released for the game, fixing many of the technical issues while also lessening the game's difficulty. Ports for the Xbox One and Xbox Series X/S were released on November 22, 2022. A Nintendo Switch port was released on April 19, 2023.

=== Tie-in media and merchandise ===
Before the release of Security Breach, on October 30, 2020, Funko released a line of action figures of the Glamrock animatronics and collectible mystery minis. On May 20, 2021, Funko also released two 12" statues: one of Glamrock Freddy and Gregory hiding from Vanny and the other of Vanny and the night guard Vanessa on opposite sides of a potted plant. When the game was delayed once more in April 2021, Cawthon released a spin-off game known as Fury’s Rage, a side-scrolling beat-em-up game. In September 2021, a series of four animated shorts called Freddy & Friends: On Tour! were released bi-weekly on the Steel Wool Studios YouTube channel, featuring teasers for the game.

=== Downloadable content ===
On May 30, 2022, free downloadable content for the game titled Ruin was announced. On May 15, 2023, the Security Breach TV website was updated with a new teaser for the upcoming DLC. Shortly after, the gameplay trailer for the DLC was released on the Steel Wool Studios YouTube channel on May 19, 2023. This trailer revealed the new protagonist's name as Cassie, whose goal is to save Gregory in the ruins of the Pizzaplex from destroyed animatronics. The DLC was released on PC, PlayStation 4, and PlayStation 5 on July 25, 2023; ports for Xbox One and Xbox Series X/S released on April 23, 2024, and for Nintendo Switch on December 12, 2024.

== Reception ==
Reception

Aggregate scores
Aggregator	Score
Metacritic	PC: 64/100
OpenCritic	55% recommend

Review scores
Publication	Score
IGN	7/10
Jeuxvideo.com	11/20
PC Games (DE)	5/10

Five Nights at Freddy's: Security Breach received "mixed or average" reviews, according to review aggregator website Metacritic. Fellow review aggregator OpenCritic assessed that the game received fair approval, being recommended by 55% of critics.

The atmosphere and visual design of the Pizzaplex were viewed positively. Ben "Yahtzee" Croshaw of The Escapist and Mike Fahey of Kotaku praised the game's visuals, with the former jokingly stating that it was likely where "all the budget" went and the latter describing it as the "best looking" game in the series. However, Nicolai Brülke of PC Games criticized the game's jumpscares, describing them as "repetitive".

The gameplay and storytelling were divisive. While Fahey and Jeuxvideo.com praised the game's new mechanics and exploration aspects, with Fahey primarily focusing on the more involved role given to Freddy, critics such as Croshaw and Gyeongcheon Min of IGN (Korea) were more critical of the gameplay, primarily criticizing the lack of indication of where the player was on the map, though Min praised the game for taking the franchise into a new direction. Brülke concurred with Min, positively viewing the new gameplay formula. The game's narrative was criticized by Croshaw and Brülke, with Croshaw stating the game "never explained" why the animatronics were hostile, and both criticizing the game's endings; Brülke considered them to be "weak" and only appealing to fans.

The game's technical performance was widely criticized, with Croshaw, Brülke, and Jeuxvideo.com all being highly critical of it. Jeuxvideo.com and Brülke viewed the game's technical performance as being damaging to the game's moments of horror, with Brülke pointing out instances where the enemies would be stuck in place and allow the player to freely roam without any threats. Furthermore, Croshaw commented that stating the game was unfinished would be "too charitable". As a result of his issues with the game, Croshaw listed Security Breach as the worst game of 2022, describing it as a "six-lane pile-up of a game".

The game was voted as the best new game of December 2021 on PlayStation's official blog.

== Sequel ==
On May 24, 2023, during a PlayStation Showcase, the tenth installment, and a direct sequel to Five Nights at Freddy's: Help Wanted, simply titled Help Wanted 2, was announced with a release date of December 14, 2023, for PlayStation VR2 and Microsoft Windows. The game features levels based on Five Nights at Freddy's: Sister Location and Security Breach.
