= Rosa 'Gene Boerner' =

Medium pink rose cultivar

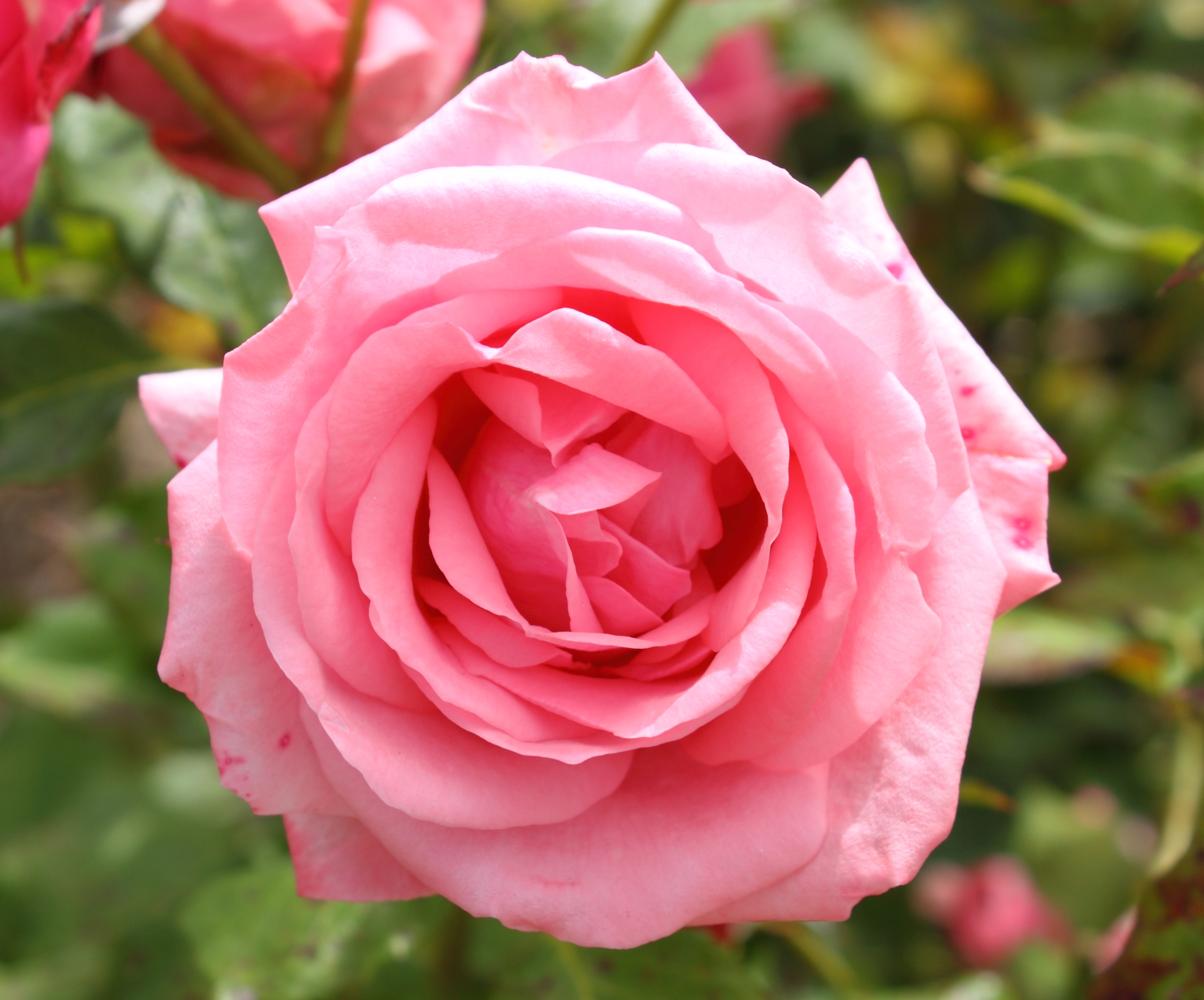
- Rosa 'Gene Boerner'
- Genus: Rosa hybrid
- Hybrid parentage: 'Ginger' x '('Ma Perkins' x 'Garnette Supreme')
- Cultivar group: Floribunda
- Marketing names: 'Gene Boerner'
- Breeder: Eugene Boerner
- Origin: United States, 1968

Rosa 'Gene Boerner' is a pink Floribunda rose cultivar, bred by Eugene Boerner and introduced into the United States by Jackson & Perkins in 1968, in honor of Boerner. The cultivar was named an All-America Rose Selections winner in 1969.

== History ==
Rosa 'Gene Boerner' was bred by the American hybridizer, Eugene Boerner, director of research at Jackson & Perkins. The new rose was introduced after Boerner's death (September 5, 1966) and released in honor of his work. "Papa Floribunda", as Boerner was known, was a world renowned rose breeder, and a pioneer in the development of Floribundas. Boerner developed more than 60 floribunda rose cultivars during his 45-year career at Jackson & Perkins; eleven Boerner rose cultivars were given the All-America Rose Selections (AARS) award.

"'Gene Boerner' is the perfect pink Floribunda rose with every flower shaped like a perfect Hybrid tea. They open out from crimson buds and have a uniform mid-pink color with deeper strawberry pink tones at the base of the petals."

— Quest-Ritson, 2011.

== Description ==
'Gene Boerner' is a vigorous, slender, upright shrub, 3 to 4 ft (91-121 cm) in height with a 2 to 3 ft (60-91 cm) plant spread. Petals are typically 2-3 inches, full form, and have 26-40 petals. The flowers are borne singly and in small clusters. Flowers are medium pink, with a mild fragrance. 'Gene Boerner' is a disease resistant plant and thrives in USDA zone, 5 and warmer. The plant is almost continuously in bloom from spring through fall. The foliage is mid-green and glossy.

== Sports ==
The sport, Rosa 'White Gene Boerner', was discovered by Yoshiho Takatori in Japan in 1978. The plant grows to a height of 4-6 feet (120 to 185 cm) and a spread of 3 feet (90 cm). There are typically 35 petals, that are white in color with pink edges, 4 inches (10 centimeters) in diameter on average.

== Awards ==
- All-America Rose Selections winner, USA, (1969)

== See also ==
- Garden roses
- Rose Hall of Fame
- List of Award of Garden Merit roses
