= Emma Tammi =

American director (born 1982)

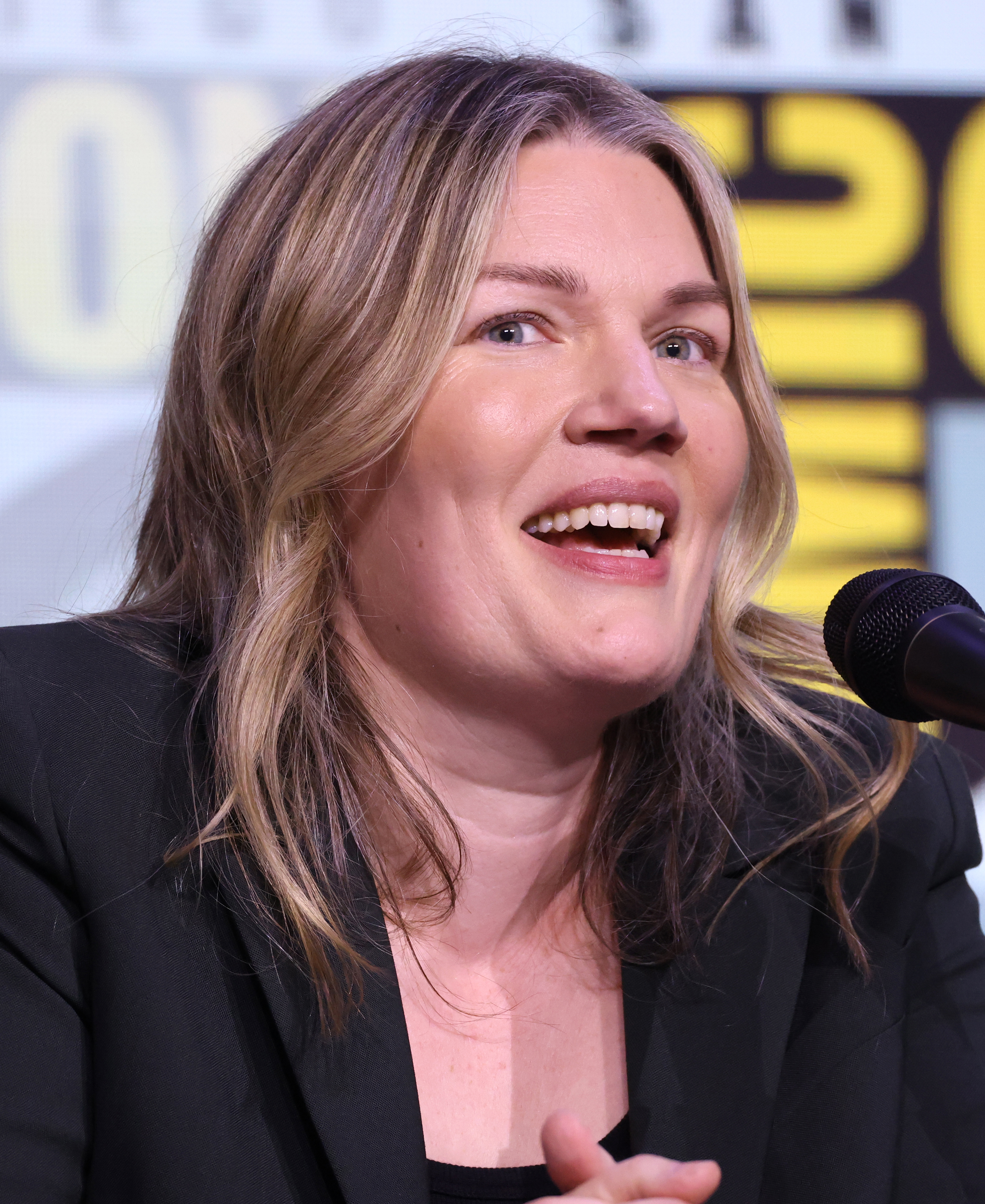
- Tammi at the 2025 San Diego Comic-Con
- Born: February 26, 1982 (age 44); Middletown, Connecticut, U.S.
- Education: Wesleyan University
- Occupation: Filmmaker

Emma Tammi (born February 26, 1982) is an American filmmaker. She is known for directing the horror films The Wind (2018), Five Nights at Freddy's (2023) and its sequel Five Nights at Freddy's 2 (2025).

== Early life ==
Tammi was born in Middletown, Connecticut, and raised in New York City, with both of her parents being actors and graduated from Wesleyan University. She is of Finnish descent through her father, Tom Tammi, who immigrated to the United States from Finland as a child with his family in 1949. She interned with Robert Altman.

== Career ==
In 2014, Tammi co-directed Fair Chase, a documentary about long-distance running, with Alex Cullen. In 2016, she co-directed Election Day: Lens Across America with Henry Jacobsen, which she described as her "first horror film".

In January 2017, at the Sundance Film Festival, producer Chris Alender, who also produced Fair Chase, approached Tammi with a script for what would eventually become The Wind, her solo feature directorial debut. The Wind premiered in 2018 at the Toronto International Film Festival. It received mostly positive reviews, with Variety calling it a "hugely promising debut", and RogerEbert.com calling Tammi "commendably unsparing", though some critics found the narrative thin.

In 2022, Jason Blum approached Tammi about directing a film adaptation of the Five Nights at Freddy's video game series. She had not previously played the games. In October that year, Variety announced Tammi's involvement. Five Nights at Freddy's premiered in 2023 to positive fan reaction and grossed $297 million at the box office, as well as being Blumhouse's biggest ever opening weekend. This also makes it one of the highest grossing films ever directed by a woman. It received mixed-to-negative reviews, though some critics praised aspects of Tammi's direction, with RogerEbert.com saying the best parts "reflect Tammi's attention to evocative details".

In 2024, a sequel, Five Nights at Freddy's 2 was announced, with Tammi returning. The film was released on December 5, 2025 with similar success at the box-office.

== Filmography ==
Documentary film

Year	Title	Director	Producer	Notes
2014	Fair Chase	Yes	Yes	Co-directed with Alex Cullen
2016	Election Day: Lens Across America	Yes	Executive	Co-directed with Henry Jacobsen

Feature film

Year	Title	Director	Executive producer	Writer
2018	The Wind	Yes	Yes	No
2023	Five Nights at Freddy's	Yes	No	Yes
2025	Five Nights at Freddy's 2	Yes	Yes	No

Television

Year	Title	Episodes
2020–2021	Into the Dark	"Delivered"
2020–2021	Into the Dark	"Blood Moon"
