= Rosa 'Ma Perkins' =

Pink rose cultivar

Rosa 'Ma Parkins'
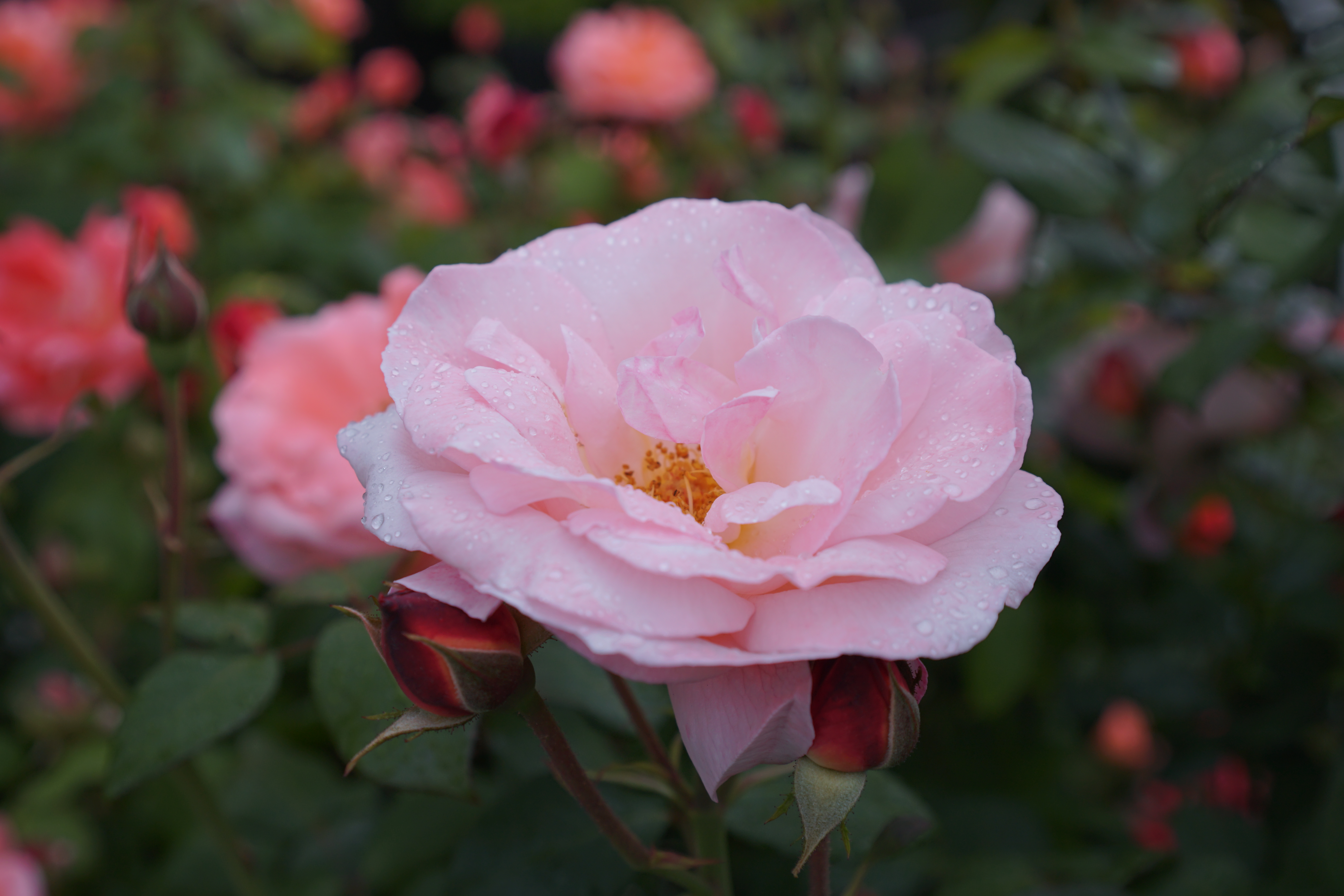
- Rosa 'Ma Perkins
- Genus: Rosa hybrid
- Hybrid parentage: Rosa 'Red Radiance' x Rosa 'Fashion'
- Cultivar group: Floribunda
- Marketing names: 'Ma Perkins'
- Breeder: Boerner
- Origin: United States, 1952

Rosa 'Ma Perkins' is a pink blend Floribunda rose cultivar bred by Gene Boerner in the US in 1952. The rose was named an All-America Rose Selections (AARS) in 1953.

== History ==
'Ma Perkins' was developed by American Gene Boerner of Jackson & Perkins in 1952. The rose variety was named for Ma Perkins, a popular American radio soap opera from 1933 to 1960. The cultivar was introduced into Australia by Hazelwood Bros. Nursery before 1954 as "Ma Perkins."

'Ma Perkins' was developed from a cross of Hybrid tea rose 'Red Radiance' and Floribunda 'Fashion'. 'Ma Perkins' was used to hybridize the cultivars 'Chanelle' (1959), 'Daily Sketch' (1961), 'Gene Boerner' (1968) AARS winner (1969), 'Pernille Poulsen' (1965), 'White Ma Perkins' (sport discovered by McDonald in 1962) and 'Wife of Bath' (1969).

== Description ==
'Ma Perkins' is a short bushy plant, 2 to 3 ft (60–91 cm) in height with a 2 to 3 ft (60–91 cm) spread. The shrub produces 26 to 40 petals in small clusters. Petals are a pink blend, usually 2-3 in (5-7 cm) in diameter and have a strong fragrance. 'Ma Perkins' blooms in flushes from spring through fall. The plant thrives best in USDA zone 6 and warmer.

== Awards ==
- All-America Rose Selections winner, USA, (1953)

== See also ==
- Garden roses
- Rose Hall of Fame
- List of Award of Garden Merit roses
