= Five Nights at Freddy's (song) =

2014 single by The Living Tombstone

Single by The Living Tombstone
- Released: August 30, 2014
- Recorded: 2014
- Genre: Electronic; pop
- Length: 2:47
- Label: Ghost Pixel Records
- Songwriter: Yoav Landau
- Producer: Yoav Landau

Music video
- "Five Nights at Freddy's 1 Song - The Living Tombstone" on YouTube

"Five Nights at Freddy's" (Note: The song is also referred to as the "Five Nights at Freddy's 1 Song" or simply "FNAF Song".) is an electronic song by electronic rock band The Living Tombstone, based on the 2014 video game of the same name. It was produced and sung by Yoav Landau, and was released as a single on August 30, 2014. The song became popular on YouTube, reaching over 400 million views by 2026. It was featured in the end credits of the video game's film adaptation released in 2023, and has been credited with creating a musical subgenre oriented around the Five Nights at Freddy's franchise.

== Background and release ==
The song was created by The Living Tombstone, who had previously been involved in creating songs based on the My Little Pony franchise. After previously being involved in that franchise's fandom, producer Yoav Landau learned about the release of the horror game Five Nights at Freddy's in 2014, and the popularity it gained. After Landau played the game for himself, he decided to create a song based on it. Landau primarily composed the song with synthesizers, which were described as being similar to those used by 100 gecs by CT Jones of Rolling Stone. Commenting about the creation of the song, Landau said "the culture of the internet is about being there first, being the first one to make a meme about a thing. In the case of FNAF, when I started to see people talking about it, it was easy to make a post with a song and lyrics about the game, see this thing catch fire, and then it goes on YouTube."

When the band asked game creator Scott Cawthon for permission to release the song due to being unaffiliated with the property, Cawthon gave them permission to publish the song as long as they gave some of their profit to charity. The song was uploaded to YouTube only three weeks after the game, and garnered millions of views shortly afterwards. In 2023, during the marketing of the game's film adaptation, the song was performed live during an event at Jim Henson's Creature Shop. Following fan speculation over its inclusion, the song was featured in the movie during the end credits. The decision to include the song in the film was made by Cawthon as early as 2016 during its early conception; Cawthon emailed Landau at the time, stating that "it's important to me that this song is in this film".

On the day of the film's release in North America, The Living Tombstone released a new version of the song, titled the "Goth Remix". In addition, a jazz cover was performed and released by the 8-Bit Big Band in 2020. For the song's 10th anniversary in 2024, The Living Tombstone released an orchestral version of the song arranged by Charlie Rosen, featuring soprano soloist Faylotte Joy Crayton.

== Reception and legacy ==
On YouTube, the song had gained around 69 million views by March 2016, 220 million by June 2021, 312 million by 2023, and 372 million by 2024. The Living Tombstone released follow-up songs based on the second and third Five Nights at Freddy's games, titled "It's Been So Long" and "Die in a Fire" respectively. Jef Rouner of Houston Press considered the first song to be the weakest in this trilogy, but that it was still a "damned spooky bit of music and a worthy place to begin".

According to CT Jones of Rolling Stone, the song started a sub-genre of music oriented around the franchise, "retain[ing] the hyper-pop influences popularized by Landau" – making the song a "defining part of the Five Nights at Freddy's fandom." The song was credited with inspiring several artists, such as JT Music and CG5. JT Music described creating songs based on the game to be "another way fans could recontextualize and reexperience the game and its story from a different perspective". The song's inclusion in the game's film adaptation was described by /Film as "a testament to the grassroots popularity" alongside the inclusion of several YouTube Let's Players, writing further that the production team behind the movie "hasn't forgotten the people who made the IP such a valuable sensation in the first place".

== Charts ==
Chart performance for "Five Nights at Freddy's"
Chart (2023)	Peak position
US Hot Dance/Electronic Songs (Billboard)	4
UK Independent Albums Breakers (OCC)	8

== Certifications ==
Certifications for "Five Nights at Freddy's"
Region	Certification	Certified units/sales
United States (RIAA)	Gold	500,000^{‡}
^{‡} Sales+streaming figures based on certification alone.
