= Five Nights at Freddy's (video game) =

2014 video game

- Developer: Scott Cawthon
- Publisher: Scott Cawthon (Note: Mobile and console ports published by Clickteam.)
- Series: Five Nights at Freddy's
- Engine: Clickteam Fusion 2.5
- Platforms: Windows; Android; iOS; Nintendo Switch; PlayStation 4; Xbox One; Windows Phone
- Release: August 8, 2014: Windows; August 8, 2014; Android; August 26, 2014; iOS; September 11, 2014; Windows Phone; December 1, 2014; Switch, PlayStation 4, Xbox One; November 29, 2019
- Genres: Survival horror, point-and-click
- Mode: Single-player

Five Nights at Freddy's (FNaF) is a 2014 point-and-click and survival horror game developed and published by Scott Cawthon. The player controls Mike Schmidt, a night security guard at a family pizzeria. Schmidt must complete his shifts while avoiding the homicidal animatronic characters that wander the restaurant at night. The player has access to security cameras to monitor the animatronics throughout the shift, and a set of steel doors that can lock out the characters. Using the cameras and doors consumes the player's limited electricity, and draining all of the power causes these tools to become inoperable. If the player fails to keep an animatronic out of the office, they will be jump scared and experience a game over.

Cawthon conceived the idea for Five Nights at Freddy's based on criticism of his previous game, Chipper & Sons Lumber Co. Reviewers complained of its unintentionally frightening characters, inspiring Cawthon to create a horror game. Developed in six months using the Clickteam Fusion 2.5 game engine, Five Nights at Freddy's was released for Windows through Desura on August 8, 2014, and through Steam on August 18. It was made available for Android, iOS, and Windows Phone later in 2014. Versions for Nintendo Switch, PlayStation 4, and Xbox One were released in 2019.

Five Nights at Freddy's received generally positive reviews from critics, many considering it a frightening and distinct horror game. Reviewers praised the atmosphere, sound design, and gameplay mechanics, although some found the jump scares repetitive and the game to have little replay value. It became the subject of Let's Play videos on YouTube and gained a large fan following. The game's success led to the launch of a media franchise, including many sequels and books, and its popularity led to imitations and fangames. A film adaptation by Blumhouse Productions was released in 2023.

== Gameplay ==
A gameplay screenshot showing the interior of the player's office, with the animatronic Chica standing at the right hallway window

Five Nights at Freddy's is a point-and-click survival horror game. The player controls Mike Schmidt, a night security guard for the family pizza restaurant Freddy Fazbear's Pizza. The player must complete their shift that lasts from midnight to 6:00 a.m. without being killed by the homicidal animatronic characters that wander the pizzeria at night.

The player character, defenseless and confined to an office, is given access to a network of security cameras that provide views of various parts of the restaurant. These camera feeds are used to track the movement of the animatronics throughout the night. Each of the four animatronic characters has distinct behaviors, and most of their movement takes place off-screen. The player has a set of lights that they can use to illuminate the hallways to the left and right of the office, and if they detect an animatronic in one of the hallways, they can activate a set of steel doors to prevent that character from entering. If an animatronic is not prevented from entering the office, it will attack and kill the player, causing a game over.

Use of the cameras, doors, and lights consume the player's limited electrical power; if all the power is exhausted, the cameras become inoperable, the doors open and the lights go out. The titular Freddy Fazbear character then appears playing the "Toreador Song", causing a game over unless the shift ends before he can attack. The player must conserve power by using the doors, cameras, and lights sparingly, saving enough electricity to last until the end of the shift. The game is divided into levels called "nights", each lasting roughly ten minutes in real-time. As the player completes each night, the animatronics become more aggressive and the difficulty increases. The main game has a total of six levels, comprising the five main nights and an extra sixth night.

== Plot ==
Five Nights at Freddy's begins with Mike Schmidt listening to a voicemail from his unnamed predecessor at the start of his first shift. Similar messages play on the following nights, in which the employee tells Schmidt about the restaurant and its history. The security officer explains that the restaurant's four animatronic characters – Freddy Fazbear, Bonnie, Chica, and Foxy – are allowed to become mobile at night due to their servomotors locking up if they are left off for too long. He warns Schmidt that if an animatronic encounters a human after hours, it will mistake them for an animatronic endoskeleton and will place the human into a spare mechanical suit, killing the person in the process.

The player is indirectly told about disturbing events in the restaurant's history. The first voicemail mentions "The Bite of '87", an incident which is implied to have led to the loss of a person's frontal lobe and forced animatronic mobility during the day to be prohibited. Newspaper clippings viewable through the camera feeds reveal that a man reportedly lured five children into a back room and killed them. Although the suspect was arrested, the children's bodies were never found. The restaurant later received complaints that the animatronics began to emit foul odors while blood and mucus leaked from their eyes and mouths.

On the fourth night, the voicemail implies that Schmidt's predecessor was killed by an animatronic while recording the message. The final message on the fifth night only consists of garbled sound. Schmidt receives paychecks after the fifth and sixth nights. After completing the sixth night, the player is given access to a seventh "custom night" where they can manipulate the AI difficulty of the animatronics. Upon finishing the seventh night, Schmidt is fired.

== Development and release ==
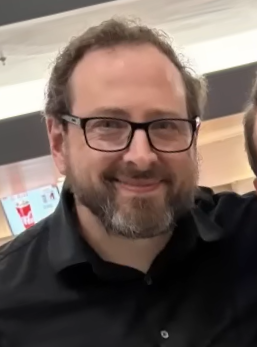
Developer Scott Cawthon in 2025

Scott Cawthon had developed several adventure games marketed towards Christians, all of which under-performed commercially. By the 2010s, these failures caused Cawthon to suffer a crisis of faith. He lost interest in game development until he regained it following a spiritual experience. The experience left Cawthon less inclined towards making Christian games, and he began production of the secular Five Nights at Freddy's.

After his construction and management game Chipper & Sons Lumber Co. received negative reviews, he decided to make his next game a horror-focused experience. Players commented that characters in the game were unintentionally unsettling and animatronic-like in appearance; reviewer James Stephanie Sterling calling the game "terrifying". Although initially discouraged by this poor reception, he was inspired to make something intentionally scarier. The homicidal animatronics Cawthon designed were influenced by the mascots found at Chuck E. Cheese party venues.

Cawthon developed the game alone over the course of six months, with his sons and friends serving as beta testers. He coded the game with the Clickteam Fusion 2.5 engine and used Autodesk 3ds Max to model the 3D graphics. The audio was produced with a combination of sound effects that Cawthon created himself and files that he purchased off the internet. Five Nights at Freddy's was first released for Windows via the Desura distribution platform on August 8, 2014. On August 18, it was also released via Steam. A version for Android was launched on August 26, followed by ports to iOS on September 11, and Windows Phone on December 1. Versions for Nintendo Switch, PlayStation 4, and Xbox One were released on November 29, 2019.

== Reception ==
Reviews

Aggregate scores
Aggregator	Score
Metacritic	PC: 78/100
OpenCritic	71% recommend (Note: Score based on 8 reviews)

Review scores
Publication	Score
GameRevolution	9/10
GameSpot	8/10
Gamezebo	4.5/5
Nintendo Life	7/10
PC Gamer (US)	80/100
TouchArcade	3.5/5

Reception of the game was generally positive. According to the review aggregate website Metacritic, Five Nights at Freddy's received "generally favorable reviews". According to the review aggregator website OpenCritic, 71% of critics recommended it. Reviewers considered Five Nights at Freddy's frightening, with some praising it as a standout horror game. Gamezebo called it a "brilliant horror experience" that capitalized on fear of the unknown, and GameSpot appreciated how it created fear without incorporating graphic violence. The critic for GameRevolution called it the most terrifying game he had ever played.

Reviewers felt that Five Nights at Freddy's gameplay mechanics were well-designed. PC Gamer said that despite the simple premise of gameplay, its mechanics combined into a frightful experience, which was concurred by GameRevolution. Nintendo Life found the controls to be easily accessible, and praised the game for making a tense mood apparent from the start. TouchArcade believed that the gameplay would feel lacking if the player was not scared by the atmosphere, and that its controls amounted to little more than "a game of red-light, green-light". PC Gamer considered that once the behaviors for the animatronics were memorized, some players would find nothing interesting beyond the ambience.

The sound design was praised. GameSpot noted the lack of music during gameplay, finding the quiet to be panic-inducing when it was interrupted by noises from the animatronics. GameRevolution considered the silence unnerving, and that the random sounds that occurred while playing complimented the atmosphere to make the experience tense. Gamezebo described the sound design as excellent, suggesting that players wear headphones not to just improve the experience, but to also detect the noises the animatronics made as they approached.

Critics debated Five Nights at Freddy's approach to horror. TouchArcade said that Five Nights at Freddy's challenged the player by forcing them to yield to their own paranoia, causing them to lose if they gave in to their fear. Nintendo Life contended that the atmosphere and lack of defensive tools created a compelling feel of dread. PC Gamer wrote that the game distinguished itself from the rest of the horror genre by relying not on jumpscares, but by pressuring the player with the possibility of one. Other reviewers considered Five Nights at Freddy's to be too reliant on jumpscares, which were effective at first but would become repetitive over time; Nintendo Life said that the game's reliance on the scares and simple controls meant there was little replay value. Although TouchArcade found repeat playthroughs monotonous, the reviewer said it conjured a well-designed atmosphere that would create the horror it intended.

== Legacy ==
Five Nights at Freddy's became a financial success and gained a large following. Its popularity was fueled by Let's Play videos that were uploaded to the video-sharing platform YouTube; by 2015, Five Nights at Freddy's had become one of the most uploaded video games on the site, and was featured by influencers such as Markiplier, Jacksepticeye, and PewDiePie. The success of Five Nights at Freddy's sparked a media franchise beginning with the release of a sequel, Five Nights at Freddy's 2.

The franchise expanded to include written works starting with the novel Five Nights at Freddy's: The Silver Eyes, published in 2015. Blumhouse Productions acquired the rights to make a film adaptation of the game in 2017. After several delays, filming began in 2023 and the picture was released in theaters and through Peacock on October 27, 2023. Cawthon retired from game development in 2021 amidst a controversy over his donations to Republican Party politicians. He intends to pass on management of the franchise at a later date.

The Five Nights at Freddy's fanbase has created elaborate theories on the nature of the games and their storylines. The complicated narrative of the franchise has been examined and debated by fans through social media, fan creations, and wikis. Cawthon has occasionally commented on some fan theories, including one presented by the YouTuber MatPat. The Five Nights at Freddy's community has remained an influential subculture on social media platforms such as TikTok and YouTube. Cawthon remained engaged with the FNaF community, using his website, the official website, and Steam forums to talk with fans.

The success of Five Nights at Freddy's inspired the creation of a considerable amount of fangames. The prevalence of Five Nights at Freddy's fangames on the publishing platform Game Jolt forced the company to create an entire video game category dedicated to the franchise and its imitations. Polygon later wrote that some of the fanbase had become primarily connected through fangame adaptations rather than the main media franchise, some choosing to play imitations rather than support Cawthon. Various artists have created music revolving around the lore, including The Living Tombstone. The Living Tombstone's first song based on the series was featured in the closing credits sequence of the film adaptation.
