= Five Nights at Freddy's 2 =

2014 video game

- Steam storefront header
- Developer: Scott Cawthon
- Publisher: Scott Cawthon (Note: Mobile and console ports published by Clickteam.)
- Series: Five Nights at Freddy's
- Engine: Clickteam Fusion 2.5
- Platforms: Windows; Android; iOS; Windows Phone; Nintendo Switch; PlayStation 4; Xbox One
- Release: November 10, 2014: Windows; November 10, 2014; Android; November 12, 2014; iOS; November 20, 2014; Windows Phone; December 1, 2014; Switch, PlayStation 4, Xbox One; November 29, 2019
- Genres: Survival horror, point-and-click
- Mode: Single-player

Five Nights at Freddy's 2 (FNaF 2) is a 2014 point-and-click survival horror game developed and published by Scott Cawthon. It is the second main installment in the Five Nights at Freddy's series. Set in a fictional pizzeria, the player takes on the role of night security guards Jeremy Fitzgerald and Fritz Smith, who must defend themselves from the restaurant's hostile animatronic mascots. The player cannot leave their office, but has access to a flashlight and security cameras throughout the restaurant to monitor animatronic activity. Wearing a mask that looks like one of the animatronics allows the player to avoid being detected in most cases, though some animatronics are repelled via other methods. If the player is detected, they will be jumpscared and experience a game over. As the game progresses, Atari-styled minigames and phone calls provide insight into the history of the restaurant.

Cawthon teased Five Nights at Freddy's 2 in September 2014. It was released for Windows via Steam on November 10, 2014, earlier than its planned release date of December 25. It was made available for Android, iOS, and Windows Phone later in 2014. Versions for Nintendo Switch, PlayStation 4, and Xbox One were released in November 2019. Five Nights at Freddy's 2 received mixed reviews from critics, with praise for the game's atmosphere, story, and jumpscares, and criticism for its difficulty. The third game in the series, Five Nights at Freddy's 3, was released on March 2, 2015. A film adaptation produced by Blumhouse Productions was released on December 5, 2025.

== Gameplay ==
A gameplay screenshot showing the protagonist's office, with the animatronic Mangle in the center hallway

Five Nights at Freddy's 2 is a point-and-click survival horror game. Players take on the role of a night security guard who must complete their shift without being caught by the homicidal animatronic characters that wander throughout the building.

The player character sits alone in an office which they cannot leave. They have access to a network of security cameras which can be used to track the movement of the animatronics. The office has three entrances; a center hallway and two side air vents. Unlike with the previous game, none of the office entrances can be sealed off, and the animatronics can enter unimpeded.

The animatronics include remodeled "toy" versions of Freddy, Bonnie, Chica and Foxy from the first game, their decrepit counterparts, and two new characters called the Puppet (also known as the Marionette) and Balloon Boy. The player can shine a light on animatronics through the camera feeds to slow them temporarily, and can avoid detection from the characters by wearing an animatronic mask. The mask does not work on Foxy or the Puppet, and the player is incapable of accessing the cameras while wearing it. The flashlight must be repeatedly shone into the center hallway to ward off Foxy, and the Puppet is subdued by a music box that must be constantly wound up using the camera feed. The power supply for camera use is unlimited, but this does not apply to the flashlight; if its battery runs out, the player becomes vulnerable.

The player character is killed if they are caught by an animatronic, except for Balloon Boy, who only disables the flashlight. After the player dies and receives a game over, there is a chance that one of four Atari-style minigame will appear. These minigames provide insight into the plot. The game is divided into levels called nights, which last several minutes in real time and gradually increase in difficulty.

== Plot ==
In 1987, Jeremy Fitzgerald begins working as a night security guard at a new Freddy Fazbear's Pizza location. An unnamed staff member calls Fitzgerald on the phone each night to provide advice and information on the franchise's backstory. The employee explains that the restaurant's animatronics feature facial recognition software connected to a criminal database, with the purpose of protecting children from potential harm. Despite these features, the robots were not programmed with a proper night mode; when they detect silence, they seek out the nearest source of noise to find people to entertain, which happens to be the security office. The caller further relates that a number of older animatronics were outfitted with this technology and are kept onsite for spare parts.

As the game progresses, the employee reveals that the restaurant is being subject to a police investigation. The Atari-styled minigames are centered around different animatronics and depict the murder of several children by a purple-colored figure. On the game's fifth night, Fitzgerald is informed by the employee that the restaurant has been put on lockdown due to an unspecified incident. At the end of the fifth night, Fitzgerald receives a paycheck. On the sixth night, the employee explains that the restaurant has been temporarily shut down, and mentions that he plans to act as the new night security guard while Fitzgerald will be promoted to a day shift. A newspaper shown upon the night's completion announces the restaurant's closure, stating that the newly redesigned "toy" animatronics will be scrapped, but their older counterparts will be saved for an eventual reopening. On the seventh "custom night", the player controls a new character named Fritz Smith. Upon completing this night, Smith is fired.

== Release and reception ==
Reviews

Aggregate score
| Aggregator | Score |
|---|---|
| Metacritic | PC: 62/100 |

Review scores
| Publication | Score |
|---|---|
| Destructoid | PC: 7/10 |
| Gamezebo | MOB: 4/5 |
| Nintendo Life | NS: 6/10 |
| PC Gamer (US) | PC: 70/100 |
| TouchArcade | MOB: 6/10 |

On September 13, 2014, Five Nights at Freddy's developer Scott Cawthon posted a teaser image for a sequel to the original on his webpage. In October 2014, a trailer was launched and the game was posted onto Steam Greenlight, with a demo being available shortly afterwards. Five Nights at Freddy's 2 was released on November 10, 2014 for Windows through Steam, ahead of the planned release date of December 25. Ports for Android and iOS were released on November 12 and 20 of the same year. Versions for Nintendo Switch, PlayStation 4, and Xbox One were released on November 29, 2019 alongside the first, third, and fourth games. Following the success of the Five Nights at Freddy's film, an adaptation of Five Nights at Freddy's 2 began production and was released on December 5, 2025.

Five Nights at Freddy's 2 received "mixed or average" reviews according to review aggregator website Metacritic. Some critics recommended it to fans of the first game. TouchArcade felt that the game was superior to its predecessor, saying that it made new innovations on gameplay and improved the story. Destructoid said that the game fine-tuned the concepts presented in the original and added more.

The atmosphere was praised. Gamezebo highlighted the sounds, jumpscares, and animatronics, saying they contributed to an overall scary game. PC Gamer said that the game had an excellent environment, and that Cawthon "further establishes his skills at crafting a truly frightening experience". Critics similarly praised the story. Destructoid equated the plot to a complex mystery, and highlighted the Atari-style mini games as intriguing and disturbing. TouchArcade found the plot to be satisfying, saying that was less subtle than the original game's, but was still mysterious.

Reviewers criticized the game's difficulty, many saying it detracted from the rest of the experience. TouchArcade said that the difficulty would discourage players who had not been interested in the original, and Gamezebo felt that the increased number of animatronics made the game feel overwhelming. PC Gamer contended that the constant pressure of the difficult gameplay took away from the horror and atmosphere. In a critical review, Nintendo Life noted that the number of tasks the player had to balance made Five Nights at Freddy's 2 stressful instead of scary, and made it feel worse than the original. The jumpscares were positively received, but some critics felt that they would become repetitive over time. Destructoid wrote that the jumpscares were effective, but would lose their horror if they were shown too frequently. Nintendo Life felt that they lost their appeal due to the complex gameplay, contending that the stress of playing made the jumpscares predictable rather than surprising.
