= Five Nights at Freddy's =

Media franchise created by Scott Cawthon

- Genre: Survival horror
- Developers: ScottGames; Steel Wool Studios; Illumix; Mega Cat Studios; Clickteam
- Publishers: ScottGames; Clickteam; Illumix; Mega Cat Studios
- Creator: Scott Cawthon
- Platforms: Platforms: Microsoft Windows; PlayStation 4; PlayStation 5; Xbox One; Xbox Series X/S; Nintendo Switch; iOS; Android; Oculus Quest; Oculus Quest 2; Google Stadia
- First release: Five Nights at Freddy's; August 8, 2014; 12 years ago
- Latest release: Five Nights at Freddy's: Secret of the Mimic; June 13, 2025; 17 months ago

Five Nights at Freddy's (FNaF, /f(ə.)næf/, f(ə-)NAF) is a media franchise created by Scott Cawthon that includes video games, novels, and films. The story arcs of the games typically follow a night guard or other character trying to survive from midnight to 6:00 a.m. for multiple levels, called "nights", while fending off attacks from homicidal animatronic characters. Each game is set in a different location connected to a fictional pizza restaurant franchise called "Freddy Fazbear's Pizza". The core mechanics involve using tools effectively and managing limited resources to avoid being caught by the animatronics.

Cawthon conceived the idea for the first video game after his family-friendly resource management game, Chipper & Sons Lumber Co., was criticized for the resemblance of its characters to frightening animatronics. Responding to this feedback, he developed a game that focused on horror. Released in August 2014, the game's success prompted the development of its sequels. Cawthon created many of the games himself using game engine Clickteam Fusion, but partnered with Steel Wool Studios to create various entries in the series, including an open-world game and a virtual reality anthology. Several spin-offs were produced in collaboration with groups such as Illumix and Mega Cat Studios. Film adaptations were released in partnership with Blumhouse Productions.

The video game series has a mixed critical reception, with praise for its storytelling and atmosphere but criticism for its gameplay. The film adaptations have received negative reviews. The franchise has achieved significant commercial success, and garnered a cult following that produces numerous forms of fan media.

== Origin and development ==
Creator Scott Cawthon in 2025

The concept for Five Nights at Freddy's stemmed from the negative reception of Scott Cawthon's earlier game, Chipper & Sons Lumber Co., where players said that the main character resembled a "scary animatronic animal." Initially discouraged by the criticism, Cawthon, who had predominantly created Christian-oriented games, leveraged this feedback to develop something intentionally frightening. Five Nights at Freddy's was released on August 8, 2014, via Desura, followed by a Steam release after gaining approval through the crowdsourcing platform Greenlight. The game rapidly gained popularity after being showcased by prominent YouTubers.

Following its success, the franchise expanded rapidly, earning a Guinness World Record for "most video game sequels in a single year" for the games released between August 2014 and June 2015. Cawthon used Clickteam Fusion 2.5 for game development and Autodesk 3ds Max for 3D graphics. Since Help Wanted in 2019, Cawthon has worked with game development company Steel Wool Studios. Ports for Five Nights at Freddy's, Five Nights at Freddy's 2, Five Nights at Freddy's 3, and Five Nights at Freddy's 4 on PlayStation 4, Xbox One, and Nintendo Switch were released on November 29, 2019. In 2021, following backlash regarding donations to members of the Republican Party, Cawthon announced his retirement from game development, stating that someone of his choosing would be "running the show" from then on.

== Media ==
Release timeline
2014	Five Nights at Freddy's
2014	Five Nights at Freddy's 2
2015	Five Nights at Freddy's 3
2015	Five Nights at Freddy's 4
2016	Five Nights at Freddy's: Sister Location
2017	Freddy Fazbear's Pizzeria Simulator
2018	Ultimate Custom Night
2019	Five Nights at Freddy's: Help Wanted
2020
2021	Five Nights at Freddy's: Security Breach
2022
2023	Five Nights at Freddy's: Help Wanted 2
2024
2025	Five Nights at Freddy's: Secret of the Mimic

=== Main series ===
- Five Nights at Freddy's was released for Microsoft Windows on August 8, 2014, followed by ports for Android and iOS on August 27 and September 11, respectively. The game follows the security guard Mike Schmidt, as he tries to survive his shift at Freddy Fazbear's Pizza that lasts from midnight to 6:00 a.m. without being killed by the homicidal animatronic characters that wander the pizzeria at night.
- Five Nights at Freddy's 2 was teased shortly after the release of the first game. A trailer was released on October 21, 2014, and it was released for Microsoft Windows on November 11, 2014 through Steam, and for Android and iOS on November 13 and 20, 2014, respectively. The game, largely inspired by its predecessor, follows Jeremy Fitzgerald, the new player character, as he tries to survive his shift at the "new and improved" Freddy Fazbear's Pizza without being attacked by any of the ten animatronics that wander from room to room.
- Five Nights at Freddy's 3 was teased on Cawthon's website in January 2015, and a trailer was released on January 26, 2015. The game launched on March 3, 2015, on Microsoft Windows, with Android and iOS ports following on March 6 and 12, respectively. It follows a night guard at a soon-to-open horror attraction based on Freddy Fazbear's Pizza called "Fazbear's Fright", who must survive the night against only one animatronic, called Springtrap.
- Five Nights at Freddy's 4 was teased in April 2015 as "The Final Chapter", its release date set as that Halloween. A trailer was released in July, and its release date was advanced to August 8. However, Cawthon announced that he had finished it on July 23, on which date he released it on Steam. Android and iOS ports were released on July 25 and August 4, respectively. The game follows an unnamed child in his bedroom as "nightmare animatronics" attack the two doors on the left and right of the room, which the player must use to defend against them.
- Five Nights at Freddy's: Sister Location was teased in April 2016 with the tagline "there was never just one", and a trailer was uploaded on May 21. It was released on Steam on October 7, 2016, with a patch released shortly after to alleviate the fourth night's difficulty. Android and iOS ports were released on December 22, 2016, and January 3, 2017, respectively. Unlike previous entries where players are confined to a single room, players must move between rooms and complete tasks.
- Freddy Fazbear's Pizzeria Simulator followed an announcement by Cawthon in July 2017 that a sixth game was in development. He released Freddy Fazbear's Pizzeria Simulator on December 4, 2017, as freeware on Steam after teasing it several days earlier as a spin-off despite being a mainline release. It is a simulation game in which the player manages a pizzeria during the day and fends off animatronics at night.
- Ultimate Custom Night was released as freeware. The customizable night contains a total of fifty animatronics from previous games, which allows the player to determine how aggressive they are during the night. The player can select the office to play in, unlock cutscenes, and choose from several themed game modes.
- Five Nights at Freddy's: Help Wanted was announced during Sony Interactive Entertainment's State of Play livestream on March 25, 2019. It was released on May 28 for Oculus Rift and HTC Vive on Windows and PlayStation VR headsets on the PlayStation 4. It was developed in collaboration between Cawthon and Steel Wool Studios, with other studios giving further support. Cawthon initially proposed recreating the original Five Nights at Freddy's in VR, but the game turned into an anthology of minigames based on the first five games in the series.
- Five Nights at Freddy's: Security Breach was announced with a teaser trailer on September 16, 2020, slated for initial release on PC, PlayStation 4, and PlayStation 5 in the year. It was delayed many times, until the release date of December 16, 2021 was set. It is the second collaboration between Steel Wool Studios and Cawthon. The game follows Gregory, a young boy trapped in an entertainment complex known as Freddy Fazbear's Mega Pizzaplex who must complete tasks while avoiding the free-roam animatronics that surveil the complex.
  - Free downloadable content for Security Breach, titled Ruin, was announced in May 2022. It was released on July 25, 2023 on PC, PlayStation 4, and PlayStation 5, with Xbox One and Xbox Series X/S versions released on April 23, 2024. The story follows a girl named Cassie who ventures within the destroyed Mega Pizzaplex in order to find Gregory while deactivating security nodes and being attacked by the ruined versions of the animatronics found in Security Breach.
- Five Nights at Freddy's: Help Wanted 2 is a direct sequel of Help Wanted. Announced on May 24, 2023, where it was scheduled for release in December 2023, the game was released on December 14 for the Oculus Quest and PlayStation VR 2. A non-VR port for PlayStation 5 was released on June 20, 2024. The game features minigames based on Sister Location and Security Breach, and was made by Steel Wool Studios.
- Five Nights at Freddy's: Secret of the Mimic, the eleventh main installment, was announced on August 6, 2024, with a trailer shown on the State of Play livestream in February 2025. The game was developed by Steel Wool Studios. It was released on June 13, 2025 for PlayStation 5 and Windows. The game was later released for Xbox Series X/S and Nintendo Switch. A physical edition for Nintendo Switch, distributed by iam8bit, began shipping in July 2026. VR support was added for PlayStation 5 through the PlayStation VR2 headset on April 28, 2026, and further support through Steam was released on May 20, 2026. The game follows Fazbear Entertainment technician Arnold, tasked with retrieving abandoned schematics inside of workshop and warehouse "Murray's Costume Manor", while being stalked by a mechanical endoskeleton called the Mimic which wears the complex's mascot costumes.

=== Spin-off games ===
- FNaF World was announced on September 15, 2015. Unlike the main series, the game is a role-playing video game using previous games' characters. Players must fight enemies and progress by unlocking perks and items. Originally planned for release on February 2, 2016, Cawthon rescheduled the release for January 22 and released it on January 21.
- Five Nights at Freddy's AR: Special Delivery, an augmented reality game with location-based gameplay, was announced on September 13, 2019. Developed by Illumix, a video game startup company, the game was released for free in November 2019. Its servers were shut down on March 14, 2024.
- Freddy in Space 2 is a side-scrolling platform shooter game and a sequel to a mini-game from FNaF World. It was released for free on December 3, 2019, on Game Jolt. The game was made to promote a charity livestream hosted by the Game Theorists YouTube channel.
- Security Breach: Fury's Rage is a free side-scrolling beat 'em up game featuring the main cast of Security Breach, set in city streets. The game was made to compensate for the release of Security Breach being delayed for a second time and was released for free on Game Jolt on April 28, 2021.
- Freddy in Space 3: Chica in Space is a side-scrolling platform shooter game and a sequel to Freddy in Space 2. It was released on October 18, 2023, under the title FNAF: The Movie: The Game, and developed by Cawthon, who claimed it a spoiler-heavy tie-in to the Five Nights at Freddy's film. It was released for free on Game Jolt.
- Five Nights at Freddy's: Into the Pit, a role-playing adventure horror game developed by Mega Cat Studios, was released on PlayStation and Xbox ports on September 27, 2024. The Nintendo Switch port was released on October 31. It is based on the first story in the Fazbear Frights short story anthology.
- Five Laps at Freddy's is a kart racing game based on characters from Five Nights at Freddy's. It was announced on June 19, 2024, to coincide with the series' 10th anniversary.
- Five Nights at Freddy's: Survival Crew is an unreleased official Roblox adaptation of the series, accidentally released in an unfinished state by its developers, Metaverse Team Frights, on December 20, 2023. The game was immediately taken down after major backlash and Cawthon promised the game would be released in a functional state sometime in 2024. In the short time the game was released, players described the gameplay as similar to the cooperative horror game, Dead by Daylight.

==== Fazbear Fanverse ====
On August 21, 2020, Cawthon announced his plan to help fund and publish Five Nights at Freddy's games developed by fans, bundled with previous installments in their respective series. Games published under this initiative include the One Night at Flumpty's series, the Five Nights at Candy's series, the Popgoes series, and The Joy of Creation. Cawthon stated that these games will come to other platforms, such as mobile and consoles, and may have merchandise created for them. The first game to be released under this initiative was a port of One Night at Flumpty's for Android and iOS on October 31 and November 18, 2020, respectively, followed by two of its sequels in 2021 on the same platforms.

=== Other media ===
Starting in 2015, Five Nights at Freddy's has been the subject of three major novels published by Scholastic, the first of which being Five Nights at Freddy's: The Silver Eyes, which released on Amazon Kindle on December 17, 2015, and on paperback on September 27, 2016. Cawthon said that the novel "expands the mythos and reveals a human element never before seen in the games". Five Nights at Freddy's: The Twisted Ones and Five Nights at Freddy's: The Fourth Closet followed, released on June 27, 2017, and June 26, 2018, respectively. Additionally, many book series comprising short stories inspired by the games have been released, such as Fazbear Frights and Tales from the Pizzaplex.

Release timeline
2023	Five Nights at Freddy's
2024
2025	Five Nights at Freddy's 2

A film adaptation based on the game series was released for streaming on Peacock and theatrically in the United States on October 27, 2023, by Universal Pictures. Produced by Blumhouse Productions, the film was directed by Emma Tammi, who co-wrote the screenplay with Cawthon and Seth Cuddeback. It stars Josh Hutcherson as Mike Schmidt from the first game, Elizabeth Lail as Vanessa, and Matthew Lillard as William Afton. Five Nights at Freddy's received generally negative reviews from critics, but was a commercial success, grossing nearly $300 million worldwide. A sequel, Five Nights at Freddy's 2, was released on December 5, 2025, with similar reception to the first film. Hutcherson, Lail, and Lillard reprised their roles, while being joined by Freddy Carter, Wayne Knight, and Skeet Ulrich among others. Cawthon repeated his role as screenwriter.

In September 2026, it was announced by Epic Games and Scott Cawthon via social media platforms that Five Nights at Freddy's was coming to the 2017 video game Fortnite Battle Royale as Gaming Legend Skins on October 1, 2026 with Freddy, Bonnie, Chica, and Foxy all appearing as skins.

== Common elements ==
The games in the Five Nights at Freddy's series are survival horror. Players typically assume the role of a nighttime security guard at an establishment or other location connected to Freddy Fazbear's Pizza, a fictional pizzeria chain. The objective is to monitor and survive the movements of homicidal animatronic characters that roam these establishments after hours. Many of the animatronics are possessed by the souls of children murdered by William Afton, the restaurant's co-founder. Players must survive from midnight to 6:00 a.m. for five shifts—referred to as "nights"—while managing a limited-use resource that, if depleted, leaves them vulnerable. These resources vary by game: for example, limited power in Five Nights at Freddy's, failing systems that require rebooting in Five Nights at Freddy's 3, and control of a friendly animatronic called Glamrock Freddy—who requires hourly recharging—in Security Breach. As the nights progress, the animatronics become more aggressive. If the player is unable to defend themselves from the animatronics, they are jumpscared and receive a game over. If they successfully survive for five nights, they win the game.

In many entries in the series, players use security cameras to track the animatronics' movements throughout the building. (Note: Specifically, in Five Nights at Freddy's, Five Nights at Freddy's 2, Five Nights at Freddy's 3, Ultimate Custom Night, Five Nights at Freddy's: Help Wanted, and Five Nights at Freddy's: Security Breach) Five Nights at Freddy's 2 introduces a music box mechanic, which must be kept wound via the camera feed to prevent the Puppet–an animatronic possessed by the other co-founder Henry Emily's daughter, who was Afton's first victim–from activating. In Five Nights at Freddy's 3, the cameras monitor a single animatronic containing an undead Afton, Springtrap, and include an audio system that can be used to lure him to different areas. Security Breach's camera system is accessed through Gregory's watch. Lights are another recurring mechanic, often used to ward off animatronics or alert players to their presence. (Note: Specifically, in Five Nights at Freddy's, Five Nights at Freddy's 2, Five Nights at Freddy's 4, Help Wanted, and Security Breach.) Doors also appear frequently, allowing players to block the animatronics in games such as Five Nights at Freddy's, Five Nights at Freddy's 4, and Help Wanted.

== Reception ==
=== Video game series ===
Aggregate review scores
Game	Metacritic
Five Nights at Freddy's	78/100
Five Nights at Freddy's 2	62/100
Five Nights at Freddy's 3	68/100
Five Nights at Freddy's 4	51/100
Five Nights at Freddy's: Sister Location	62/100
Five Nights at Freddy's: Help Wanted	80/100
Five Nights at Freddy's: Security Breach	64/100
Five Nights at Freddy's: Into the Pit	87/100

The Five Nights at Freddy's video game series has had a mixed reception. The original game received "generally favorable" reviews, earning a score of 78 on the review aggregator website Metacritic. Omri Petitte of PC Gamer described it as a "less-is-more" experience, where fear stemmed more from anticipation than direct threats. However, Petitte said the gameplay became repetitive once its mechanics were mastered. GameRevolution's Ryan Bates commended the game's audio design and simple yet effective mechanics, calling it "horror done right," though he found the experience too short.

Subsequent entries saw divided responses. Five Nights at Freddy's 2 received a Metacritic score of 62, with reviewers from Destructoid and TouchArcade finding its introduction of new mechanics and animatronics creatively enriching, though Mitch Vogel of Nintendo Life found the difficulty punishing and the jumpscares excessive. Five Nights at Freddy's 3, which earned a Metacritic score of 68, maintained the franchise's core formula but updated its camera system; Petitte appreciated these improvements but felt the phantom animatronics fell short of their older counterparts. Nic Rowen of Destructoid found it mechanically solid yet lacking the charm of earlier entries. Five Nights at Freddy's 4, earned the series's lowest Metacritic score of 51 and divided reviewers further—The Escapist and Gamezebo highlighted its darker tone, emotional subtext, and scare factor, but others, like Rowen, called its gameplay confusing and encountered technical issues.

Reviews for Sister Location were again mixed, with Metacritic assigning a score of 62. Patricia Hernandez of Kotaku called it Scott Cawthon's "most ambitious game yet," praising its production value, while Rowen and William Hughes of The A.V. Club highlighted the improved mobility and task-based gameplay. Other critics, such as Angelo M. D'Argenio of GameCrate, argued the difficulty was unbalanced, likening each night to its own tutorial, while Rowen criticized night four as a frustrating obstacle. Additionally, outlets like Rock Paper Shotgun and GameCrate applauded Freddy Fazbear's Pizzeria Simulator's blend of business simulation and survival horror, while PC Gamer described Ultimate Custom Night as an inventive twist on the franchise's standard gameplay loop.

Later titles continued to have mixed feedback. Help Wanted received praise for its use of virtual reality, with the PlayStation 4 version earning a Metacritic score of 80. Reviewers highlighted its atmosphere and blending of old and new content. However, non-VR ports were criticized—Nintendo Life rated the Switch version poorly, citing the loss of VR functionality as a major drawback. Security Breach, which was assigned a score of 64 by Metacritic, drew attention for its larger scope and visuals, but faced criticism for technical issues and a clunky save system by critics such as Ben Croshaw of The Escapist. Hadley Vincent of Destructoid praised the level design and exploration for Secret of the Mimic, but criticized the lack of jumpscares, gameplay, bosses, and technical issues. Meanwhile, Into the Pit, based on the franchise's extended universe, was positively received for its innovation yet adherence to the tone of the original series. It received the series's highest Metacritic score of 87.

=== Film adaptations ===
Both Five Nights at Freddy's films received negative reviews from critics. Metacritic assigned the first film a score of 33 out of 100, indicating "generally unfavorable" reviews. Murtada Elfadl of Variety criticized the film as not utilizing its setting, writing that the sets lacked color and missed the potential appeal of a haunted pizzeria. Benjamin Lee of The Guardian said that the premise called back to the horror films of the 1980s, but said that this effect was diminished by a boring protagonist. The reviewer found the setting interesting, but disliked the script and felt that the plot lacked tension. Simon Abrams of RogerEbert.com gave the film two stars out of four, saying that it was able to form an effective atmosphere, though it created an unenjoyable experience by not giving characters enough development. He cited the actors Josh Hutcherson and Matthew Lillard as demonstrating feelings that weren't adequately described through the script, finding the overall experience unmemorable.

Metacritic assigned the second film a score of 24 out of 100, indicating "generally unfavorable" reviews. James Mottram of NME said that the film was unable to expand the backstory of the animatronics from the preceding film and lacked effective jumpscares. Frank Scheck of The Hollywood Reporter found the plot to be too similar to that of the first film. The reviewer called the script dull, adding that it contained easter eggs that would only appeal to existing fans of the franchise. Jesse Hassenger of The Guardian criticized Cawthon's script and said that the director Emma Tammi was unable to create suspense, writing that the ending was poorly executed and that the film existed as part of a franchise instead of having an individual identity.

=== Legacy ===
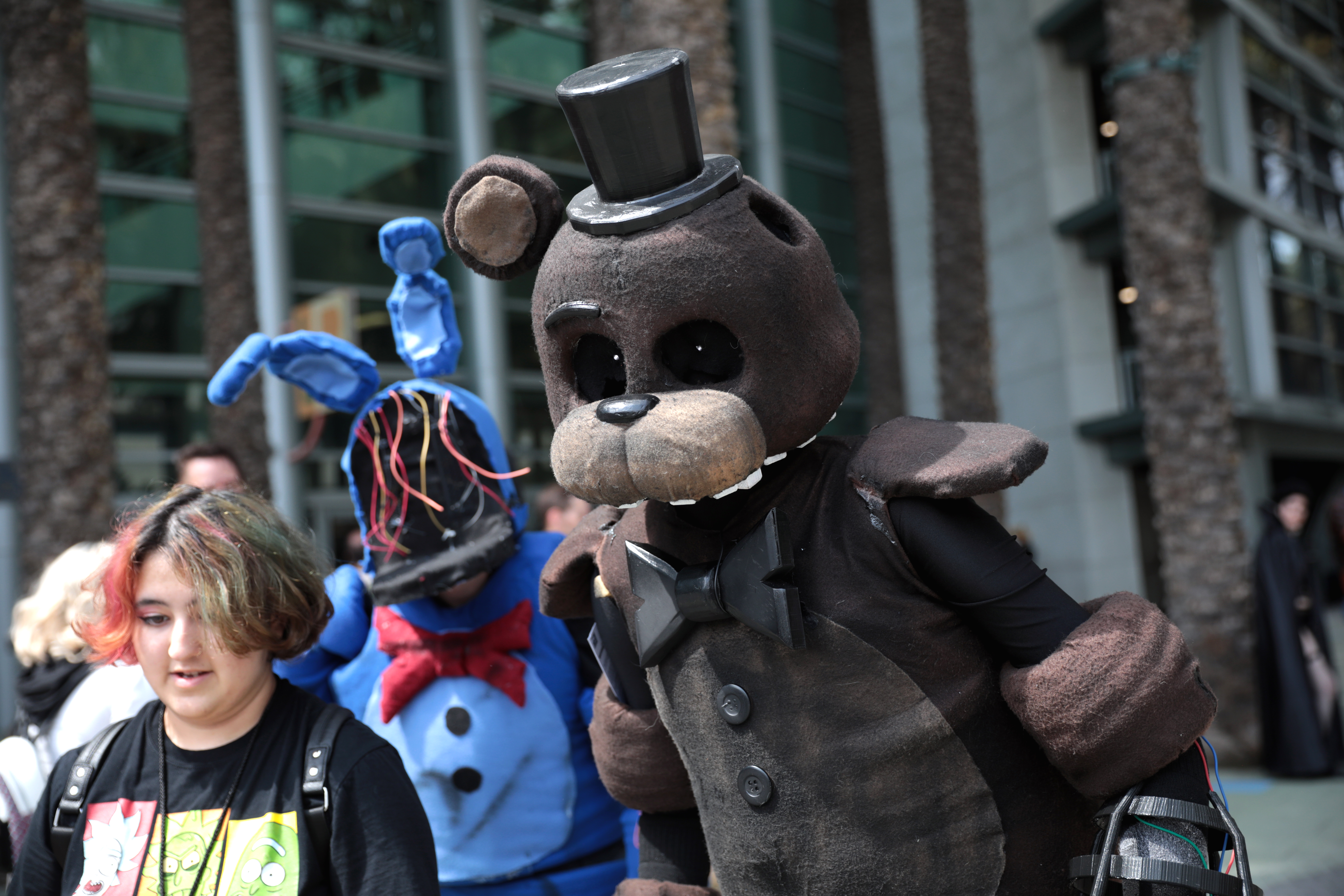
A duet of cosplayers at WonderCon 2022 dressed as Withered Bonnie (Five Nights at Freddy's 2, left background) and Ignited Freddy (The Joy of Creation, right foreground)

Since the release of the first game, popular video creators such as PewDiePie, Markiplier, and Jacksepticeye have earned millions of views on their playthroughs of the series, which helped the games in receiving additional attention. In May 2015, YouTube reported that videos of the Five Nights at Freddy's series were the platform's eighth-most-watched playthroughs. The interpretive, non-linear, and cryptic narrative of Five Nights at Freddy's is a popular topic for fans to discuss and debate; this, along with YouTube channels such as The Game Theorists, who feature Five Nights at Freddy's-related videos with the goal of decoding the lore of the franchise, contribute to an immensely dedicated fandom. In 2023, the FNaF series on the Game Theorists had over 60 videos and 800 million views combined.

The game mechanics of Five Nights at Freddy's have inspired the creation of thousands of fan games. Their prevalence led Game Jolt to categorize FNaF-inspired projects as a separate genre to better organize its content. The franchise has also influenced music, with fan-made songs, such as those by The Living Tombstone, garnering hundreds of millions of views. Their first FNaF song was featured in the closing credits of the film adaptation. Additionally, a range of toys and collectibles has been released, with Funko and McFarlane among the major producers. A themed attraction based on the film appeared at Universal Studios' Halloween Horror Nights on select nights between September and November 2025.
