= Jump scare =

Technique in media to surprise viewers

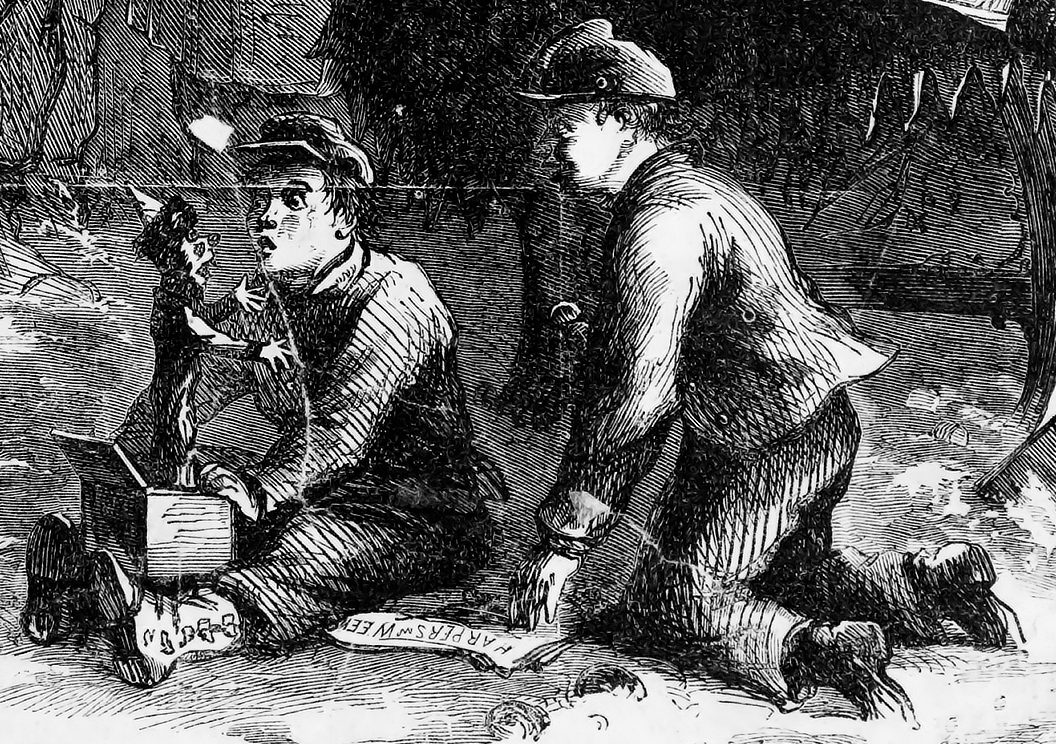
Basic principle of a jump-scare in its early form as a jack-in-the-box. Illustration of the Harper's Weekly magazine from 1863

A jump scare (also written as jump-scare or jumpscare) is a scaring technique used in media, particularly in horror fiction such as horror films and horror games, intended to scare the viewer by surprising them with a creepy face or object, usually accompanied by a loud sound. The jump scare has been described as "one of the most basic building blocks of horror movies". Jump scares can startle the viewer by appearing at a point in the film where the soundtrack is quiet and the viewer is not expecting anything alarming to happen, or can be the sudden payoff to a long period of suspense.

Some critics have described jump scares as a lazy way to frighten viewers, and believe that the horror genre has undergone a decline in recent years following an over-reliance on the jump scare trope, establishing it as a cliché of modern horror films.

== In film ==
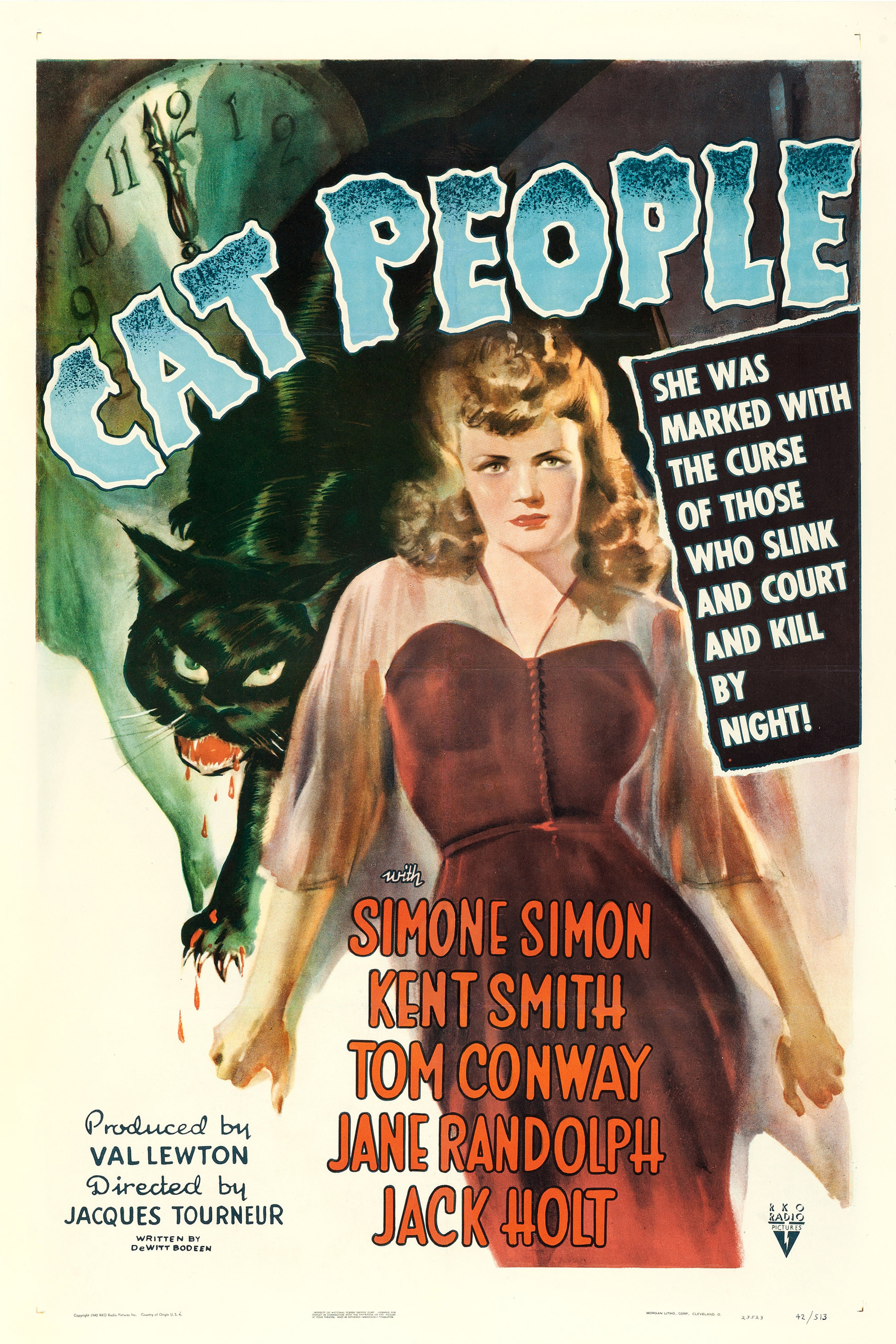
The poster for Cat People (1942), which featured the Lewton Bus technique, considered the first jump scare

Though not intended as a scare, the film Citizen Kane (1941) includes an abrupt wipe transition near the ending of the film which features a shrieking cockatoo. According to Orson Welles, this was intended to startle audience members who might have been beginning to doze off towards the end of the film.

While editing Cat People (1942), Jacques Tourneur created the jump scare, in which quiet tension builds and is suddenly and unexpectedly interrupted by a loud noise, cut, or fast movement, startling the viewer. In the film, Alice is walking home along a deserted street late at night, and realizes Irena is following her. Alice begins to panic, running, and the silence of the night, the contrast between light and deep shadow, shots of the fearful Alice, and the intermittent clacking of high heels set up suspense: abruptly, a bus enters the frame with a loud unpleasant noise, scaring the viewer. The jump scare device is sometimes called the Lewton Bus after producer Val Lewton, who used it in subsequent films. Prior to the 1980s, jump scares were relatively rare in horror movies; however, they (in particular the Lewton Bus) became increasingly common in the early 1980s as the slasher subgenre increased in popularity.

Carrie, released in 1976, has one of the first modern jump scares. The scene in which Carrie's bloodied arm abruptly emerges from the soil at the end of the film is credited as the inspiration for the use of a final jump scare in the 1980 film Friday the 13th, to show that an apparently dead character had survived.

The 1979 film When a Stranger Calls uses a form of jump scare to suddenly reveal the location of the antagonist to both the protagonist and the audience. Film writer William Cheng describes this as causing a "sudden vanishing of the protective walls surrounding the film's protagonist", in turn giving the viewer at home a sense that the intruder is also somehow closer to them.

The 1980 film The Shining is known for its "misplaced" jump scares, whereby director Stanley Kubrick appears to subvert horror conventions with seemingly banal occurrences which coincide with a dramatic cymbal crash preceded by a tense orchestral build up. Such instances include the appearance of a title card announcing "Tuesday" or when Jack Torrance, the film's main antagonist, removes a sheet of paper from a typewriter.

Several of David Lynch's films use jump scares, such as Mullholland Drive and Inland Empire.

The 2009 film Drag Me to Hell contains jump scares throughout, with director Sam Raimi saying he wanted to create a horror film with "big shocks that'll hopefully make audiences jump."

== In video games ==
Resident Evil is often cited as an early video game to use jump scares. The player, during the course of the game, walks through a hallway where the music begins to lower. About halfway through the hall, zombie dogs will suddenly leap through the windows and the music will peak in volume and intensity. However, the earliest known instance of a video game jump scare is in the 1985 Lucasfilm game Rescue on Fractalus!, wherein while the player is saving stranded humans on a hostile world, sometimes a supposed evacuee approaching the player's ship turns out to be a hostile alien who jumps on the ship's windscreen.

The video game Daylight was described as being a "vehicle for jump scares", and though reviewers praised its successful use of jump scares, they commented that, as the game wore on, jump scares alone were not a sufficient tool for scaring players.

The 2014 video game franchise Five Nights at Freddy's was described as "perfect for live streaming" due in part to its use of jump scares.

== In advertising ==
=== K-fee ===
In 2004, K-fee (Kaffee), a German caffeinated energy drink company, released nine television advertisements that feature peaceful footage, such as a car driving through a green valley, or two people at a beach. A zombie (Note: The "beach", "boardwalk", "buddha" and "golf" commercials have a gargoyle instead of a zombie. The "boardwalk" and "golf" commercials have the same gargoyle pop up upside-down.) then pops up on the screen, along with a loud, high-pitched scream, potentially scaring the viewer. At the end of each advertisement, the slogan, "So wach warst du noch nie.", which translates into English as, "You've never been so awake.", (Note: The slogan in the advertisement's English version is quoted as "Ever been so wide awake?") appears on the screen, simulating the effect the energy drink will have on its consumers. Four radio ads were also released such as a Christmas story and a meditation audio, both in German and English, with the last intended to expand the brand to the United Kingdom.

Verizon released a similar commercial in the second half of the 2000s. This commercial is similar to K-fee ads, with the jumpscare being of a man and the scream being different, and the slogan saying "Think that was scary?". In the mid-to-late 2000s, a spoof of the "Auto" commercial was made with the following changes: the slogan says something similar to the slogan and fades out, and the K-fee logo is replaced with a red-tinted logo (similar to the 1990s Comedy Central logo) inflating like an explosion before returning to the normal positions and the voice whispering sounds like a static; these accompany a piece of music sounding like a slap bass.

In 2021, English commentator Rhys Production 11 interviewed two of the actors who starred in the K-fee commercials, Brad Johnson and his brother Adam Johnson, who revealed that the company originally used puppets "to create scary objects". After this plan did not work, the brothers themselves starred in the commercials.

=== The Nun ad ===
In August 2018, a video marketing The Nun depicts the iOS device volume icon muting before the titular character appears with an incredibly loud scream. The ad was removed shortly afterward for violating YouTube's "shocking content policy".

== Internet screamers ==
An Internet screamer or simply screamer is an image, video or application on the Internet that has a sudden change designed to startle the user, typically using a scary face with a loud scream.

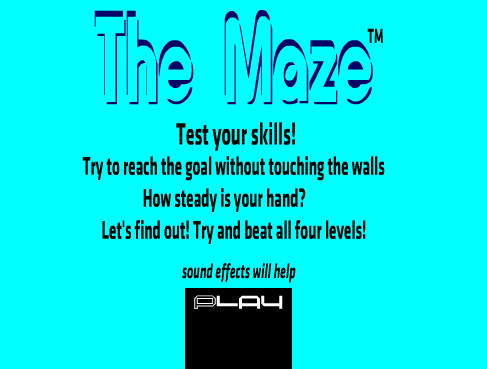
The opening screen of The Scary Maze Game

A notable example of an Internet screamer is The Maze (often called Scary Maze Game) by Jeremy Winterrowd in 2004. Introduced as a computer game, the player is supposed to use their mouse to move a blue square along a given path without touching the walls. As the player progresses, the walls get smaller, making it more difficult for the player to avoid touching the walls, and forces the player to bring their face closer to the screen. At first, if the player accidentally touches the wall, it will lead back to the start menu and the player has to start again. However, once the player reaches level 3, the walls get so thin that it becomes very difficult to avoid touching the wall, which is done on purpose to get the player more focused on the game and possibly to move closer to the screen. When the player reaches a certain point, whether they touch a wall or not, an image of the possessed Regan MacNeil (Linda Blair) from the film The Exorcist suddenly appears on the screen along with a loud scream that plays twice.

=== Reaction videos ===
Reaction videos to Scary Maze Game proliferated from the late 2000s to the early 2010s

After the rise of YouTube, Internet screamers gradually transitioned from chain emails to reaction videos where people filmed as they pranked others to click on an Internet screamer and record their reactions, or use a character's scream edited with jumpscare so it appears as though the character is reacting to a jumpscare. A prominent early screamer reaction video (a sketch by Saturday Night Live) was uploaded on YouTube in May 2006 by user CantWeAllJusGetAlong. The video features a boy (Bobby Moynihan) sitting at a desk while playing The Scary Maze Game. In the video, the boy, initially confused, asks "Why can't I touch this?", however a picture of a scary creature appears with a big shout, the boy punches through the screen and breaks the computer, urinates in his pants, and runs towards the person filming him, starting to cry. Since the upload, the video has been viewed over 25 million times. Maze reaction videos were featured twice on America's Funniest Home Videos.

== See also ==
- Startle response
- Symphony No. 94 (Haydn), popularly known as the "'Surprise' Symphony" due to its use of a fortississimo dominant chord to interrupt the placid opening section of its second movement
