= Five Nights at Freddy's (film) =

2023 film directed by Emma Tammi

- Theatrical release poster
- Directed by: Emma Tammi
- Screenplay by: Scott Cawthon; Seth Cuddeback; Emma Tammi
- Story by: Scott Cawthon; Chris Lee Hill; Tyler MacIntyre
- Based on: Five Nights at Freddy's by Scott Cawthon
- Produced by: Scott Cawthon; Jason Blum
- Starring: Josh Hutcherson; Elizabeth Lail; Piper Rubio; Mary Stuart Masterson; Matthew Lillard
- Cinematography: Lyn Moncrief
- Edited by: Andrew Wesman; William Paley
- Music by: The Newton Brothers
- Production company: Blumhouse Productions
- Distributed by: Universal Pictures
- Release dates: October 25, 2023 (United Kingdom); October 27, 2023 (United States)
- Running time: 109 minutes
- Country: United States
- Language: English
- Budget: $20 million
- Box office: $298.3 million

Five Nights at Freddy's is a 2023 American supernatural horror film based on the video game series of the same name created by Scott Cawthon. It was directed by Emma Tammi, written by Cawthon, Tammi and Seth Cuddeback, and produced by Jason Blum and Cawthon. The film stars Josh Hutcherson as a troubled security guard who starts a job at an unsafe abandoned pizzeria, where he discovers that its animatronic mascots are possessed by the spirits of children who were murdered by a serial killer (portrayed by Matthew Lillard) years prior. It additionally features Elizabeth Lail, Piper Rubio, and Mary Stuart Masterson in supporting roles.

Development of a Five Nights at Freddy's film adaptation began in April 2015 under Warner Bros. Pictures. Roy Lee, Seth Grahame-Smith and David Katzenberg were set to produce it, with Gil Kenan announced as director and co-writer. After multiple production delays, further development on the film was transferred from Warner Bros. to Blum's Blumhouse Productions in March 2017 and Kenan resigned as director from the project that May. Chris Columbus was hired to direct and write the film in February 2018—which was subjected to further re-writing—ultimately leaving the project and being replaced by Tammi in October 2022. Principal photography occurred from February to April 2023 in New Orleans and surrounding communities, with Jim Henson's Creature Shop creating the animatronics.

Five Nights at Freddy's was simultaneously released for streaming on Peacock and theatrically in the United States on October 27, 2023, by Universal Pictures. The film received generally negative reviews from critics, though it was better received by audiences and fans of the source material, and was a commercial success, grossing $298 million on a budget of $20 million, becoming Blumhouse's highest grossing film until it was overtaken by Obsession (2025). A sequel, Five Nights at Freddy's 2, based on the second video game, was released in 2025, with most of the crew returning (including Tammi and Cawthon) and most of the main cast reprising their roles.

== Plot ==
In 2000, mall security guard Mike Schmidt is fired for assaulting a father whom he had mistaken for a kidnapper. His career counselor, Steve Raglan, offers him a job as a night guard at Freddy Fazbear's Pizza, a once-successful pizzeria. Mike accepts after social services threaten to take custody of his younger sister, Abby, and pass her to their estranged aunt, Jane, who desires the monthly custody payments.

During his first night, Mike falls asleep and has a nightmare about the kidnapping of his younger brother, Garrett. Within the nightmare, he meets five children who also witnessed the event. The next day, Jane hires a gang of vandals, including Abby's babysitter, Max, to vandalize the pizzeria and get Mike fired, hastening her custody of Abby. Mike meets police officer Vanessa Shelly, who explains that the building closed during the 1980s after several children went missing there. Once Mike's shift ends and he leaves, the vandals break in, but the pizzeria's animatronic mascots—Freddy Fazbear, Bonnie, Chica, Foxy and Mr. Cupcake—kill the entire group.

On his third night, Mike brings Abby to work when Max fails to show. The animatronics befriend her and Mike discovers that they are possessed by the spirits of the missing children, who consistently mention a "yellow rabbit". Vanessa warns Mike not to touch the 'springlock' suits, which contain internal gears with a faulty design that can impale the wearer. On the fourth night, Abby is accidentally injured while bonding with the animatronics. The next day, Mike reluctantly allows Jane to babysit Abby while he goes back to Freddy’s with sleeping pills, hoping to induce more dreams to learn what happened to Garrett. In the dream, the children offer for Mike to stay with Garrett forever in exchange for Abby. Mike initially accepts, but when he changes his mind, he is attacked and injured by Foxy. A disused Freddy animatronic (Note: Identified off-screen as Golden Freddy) incapacitates Jane and brings Abby back to the pizzeria.

Vanessa reveals that she is the daughter of William Afton, the serial killer who kidnapped and murdered Garrett and the other children, hiding their corpses in the animatronics, and allowing their souls to be under his control. Realizing the animatronics plan to murder Abby and have her join them in the afterlife, Mike rushes to the pizzeria and thwarts the animatronics, but Afton arrives in the yellow rabbit suit and reactivates them. He then reveals himself to be Raglan and stabs Vanessa. Reminded of the animatronics' fondness of drawings, Abby draws a picture of Afton's actions to free them from his influence. Now knowing the truth, the animatronics turn on Afton, sabotaging his suit's springlock mechanisms and wounding him before he is dragged away.

Mike, Abby and Vanessa flee as the building collapses. Vanessa falls into a coma and is hospitalized, while Mike and Abby reconcile. At the pizzeria, the leader of the children observes the dying Afton before leaving him to his fate.

== Cast ==
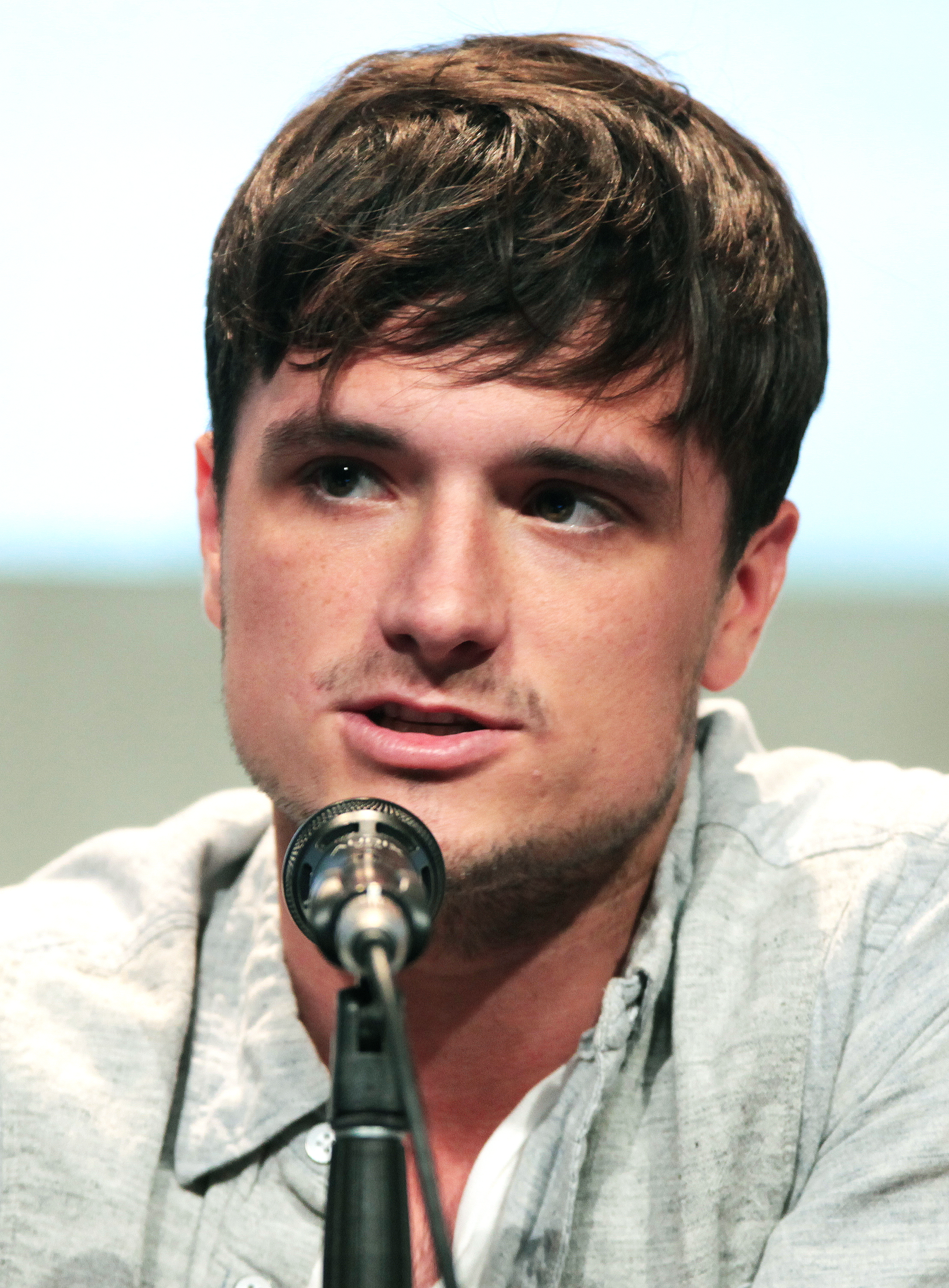
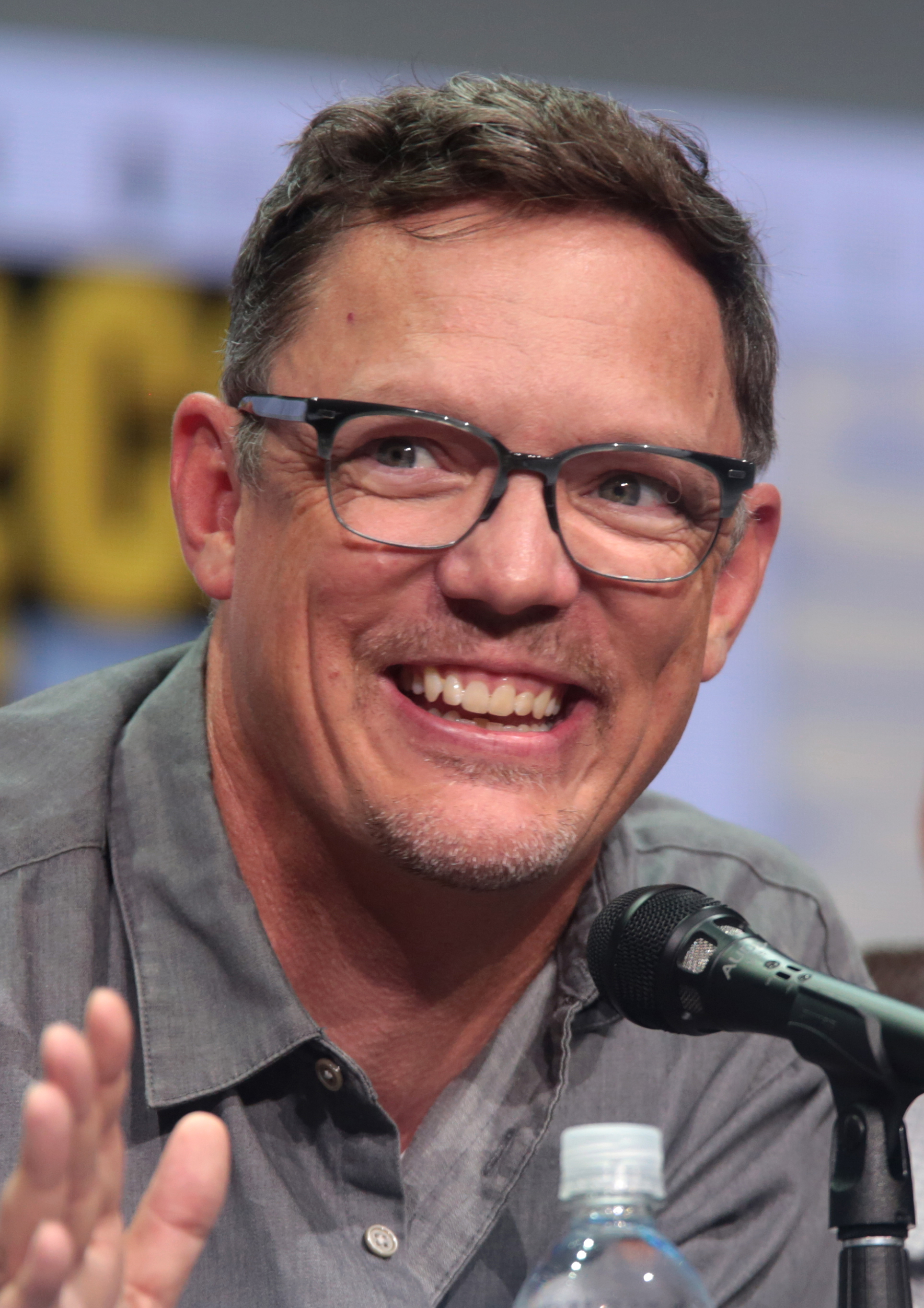
Josh Hutcherson (left) and Matthew Lillard (right) play Mike Schmidt and William Afton respectively.
- Josh Hutcherson as Mike Schmidt, a struggling young man who takes a job as the night guard of Freddy Fazbear's Pizza
  - Wyatt Parker additionally portrayed the character's younger self.
- Elizabeth Lail as Vanessa Shelly, a local police officer
- Piper Rubio as Abby Schmidt, Mike's younger sister
- Matthew Lillard as William Afton, Mike's career counselor and serial child murderer, who initially goes by the alias Steve Raglan
- Mary Stuart Masterson as Jane Schmidt, Mike and Abby's aunt
- Kat Conner Sterling as Max, Abby's babysitter
- David Lind as Jeff, the leader of a juvenile gang and Max's brother
- Christian Stokes as Hank, a member of Jeff's gang
- Joseph Poliquin as Carl, a member of Jeff's gang
- Grant Feely as the murdered child whose soul is possessing Golden Freddy
- Asher Colton Spence as the murdered child whose soul is possessing Foxy
- David Huston Doty as the murdered child whose soul is possessing Bonnie
- Liam Hendrix as the murdered child whose soul is possessing Freddy Fazbear
- Jophielle Love as the murdered child whose soul is possessing Chica
- Tadasay Young as Doctor Lillian, Abby's therapist
- Michael P. Sullivan as Doug, Jane's lawyer
- Lucas Grant as Garrett Schmidt, Mike and Abby's brother who was abducted by Afton as a child
- Theodus Crane as Jeremiah, Mike's previous co-worker
- Matthew Patrick as a waiter at a local diner
- Cory Williams as a taxi driver

The suit performers include Kevin Foster as Freddy Fazbear, the pizzeria's namesake and bear-based animatronic; Jade Kindar-Martin as Bonnie, a rabbit-based animatronic; and Jess Weiss as Chica, a chicken-based animatronic. The scatted pirate song that Foxy, a fox-based animatronic, sings throughout the film is performed by Kellen Goff, known for his voice roles in the source material.

== Production ==
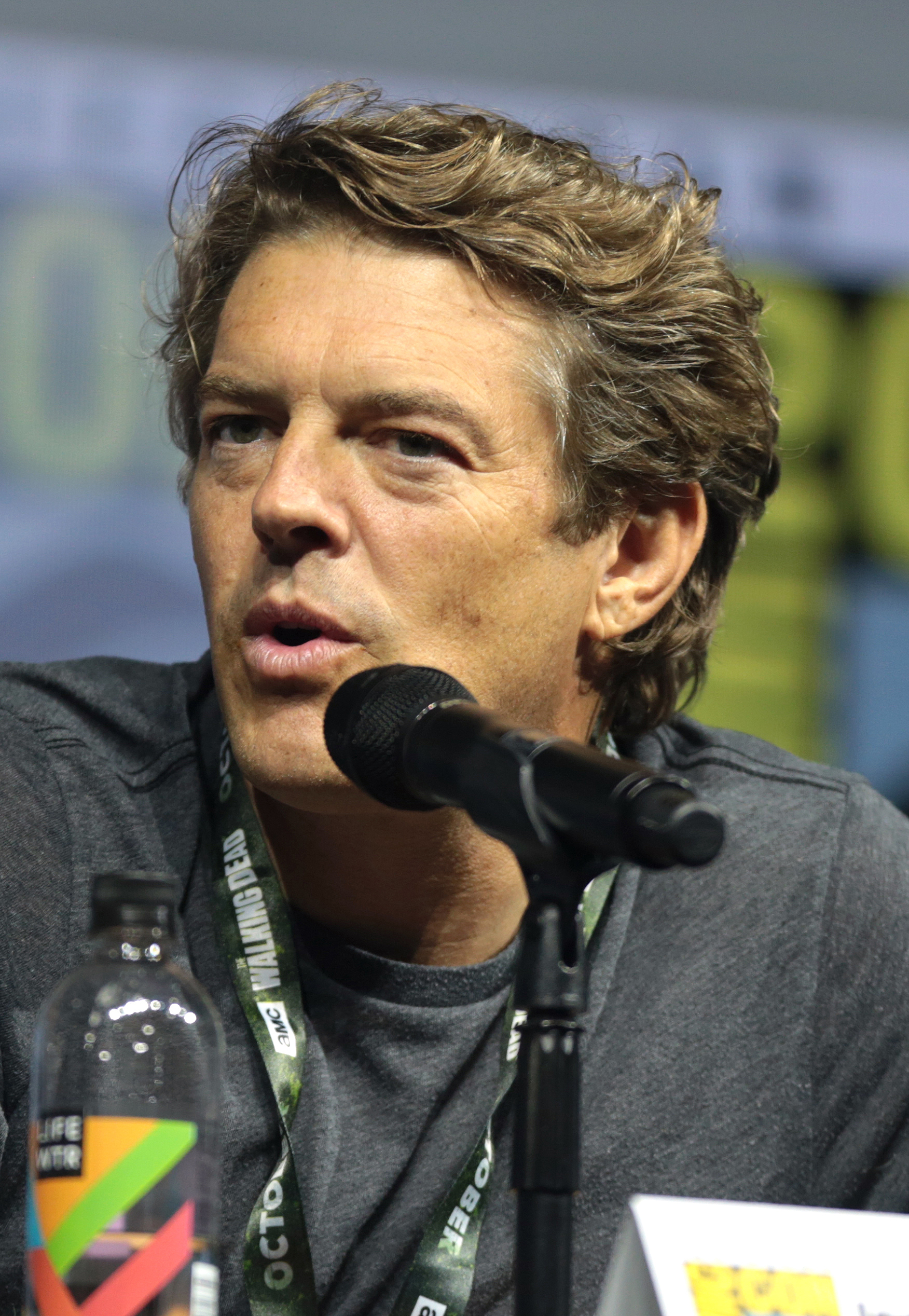
Producer Jason Blum in 2018

=== Development ===
In April 2015, Warner Bros. Pictures announced it had acquired the film rights to the Five Nights at Freddy's video game franchise with Roy Lee, David Katzenberg, and Seth Grahame-Smith set to produce the adaptation. Grahame-Smith stated that they would collaborate with franchise creator Scott Cawthon, who co-wrote the books in collaboration with ghostwriting firm Kevin Anderson and Associates, "to make an insane, terrifying and weirdly adorable movie". In July 2015, Gil Kenan signed to direct the film from a screenplay co-written with Tyler Burton Smith.

In March 2017, Cawthon announced Blumhouse Productions as the film's new production company after Warner Bros. Pictures put the project in turnaround. In May 2017, producer Jason Blum said he was excited and working closely with Cawthon on the film. In June 2017, Kenan said he was no longer directing the film.

In February 2018, Chris Columbus was announced as Kenan's replacement as director and writer, besides producing the film alongside Blum and Cawthon. In August 2018, Cawthon revealed that the first draft of the film's script, which he wrote with co-author of the Five Nights at Freddy's novel trilogy, Kira Breed-Wrisley, was completed, and it would involve the events of the series' first game. That same month, Blum wrote on Twitter that the film was aiming for a 2020 release. In November, Cawthon announced that he scrapped the script, despite being liked by Columbus and Blum, as he "had a different idea for [the story], one that I liked better". It contributed to a further delay to the film, for which Cawthon took full responsibility. In June 2020, during an interview with Fandom, Blum, when asked about the progress of the film, stated:

"It's super active, so I really feel like we have a very good shot at seeing a Five Nights at Freddy's movie...I feel like it's really moving forward; it's not stalled or anything else. It's moving forward rapidly. I don't want to put a timeline on it, but soon we'll get a movie. I feel really confident about that."

In September 2021, Blum revealed that Columbus was no longer involved with the project, which was still in active development. In August 2022, Blum announced that Jim Henson's Creature Shop would be working on the animatronic characters for the film. In October, Emma Tammi was announced as Columbus' replacement as director, in addition to co-writing the screenplay alongside Cawthon and Seth Cuddeback.

=== Casting ===
In December 2022, Josh Hutcherson and Matthew Lillard joined the cast in undisclosed roles. Five Nights at Freddy's-related YouTuber Dawko later revealed during a livestream that Hutcherson would portray the first game's security guard Mike Schmidt and Lillard would portray the franchise's main villain William Afton. He also revealed that Mary Stuart Masterson and Piper Rubio joined the cast as Mike's aunt Jane, and Mike's younger sister Abby, respectively. In March 2023, it was reported that Kat Conner Sterling and Elizabeth Lail were cast in the film. Lucas Grant and Jessica Blackmore were also cast in undisclosed roles.

Mark Fischbach, also known as Markiplier, was contacted to have a role in the film as the security guard that preceded Mike before being murdered at the opening of the film, but turned it down due to scheduling conflicts with his own film Iron Lung.

=== Filming ===
Principal photography was initially set to begin in March 2021. However, due to script issues, filming was delayed. Filming began in New Orleans on February 1, 2023, under the working title Bad Cupcake, with an estimated production budget of $25 million before tax incentives. The first scene filmed was at the fictional 'Sparky's Diner', with YouTuber Matthew "MatPat" Patrick present to film a cameo. Lillard began filming his scenes in mid-February. Filming wrapped on April 3.

=== Music ===
The Newton Brothers composed the film's score, while the fan-made song "Five Nights at Freddy's" by the Living Tombstone was featured in the end credits. "Talking in Your Sleep" by the Romantics is featured in multiple scenes where the song is performed by the animatronics.

== Marketing and release ==
Five Nights at Freddy's was released simultaneously in theaters and on Peacock in the United States by Universal Pictures on October 27, 2023. It was released two days earlier on October 25, 2023, in the United Kingdom. The film was released on Amazon Prime Video on March 5, 2024, after its removal from Peacock.

In October 2023, the film's animatronics were put on display for Universal's Halloween Horror Nights at the Universal Studios Hollywood theme park, with a pop-up location also being built at Sunset Boulevard, both of which are located in Los Angeles, California. The latter is described as being decorated similarly to the Freddy Fazbear's Pizza location as seen in the film. A making-of book titled The Art and Making of Five Nights at Freddy's: The Movie was originally set to be released on August 20, 2024, but was postponed to November 3rd, 2026, now renamed Five Nights at Freddy's: The Official Art and Making of the Movies and including content for the second film. A novelization of the film was released on December 26, 2023. The film was also released on digital platforms on November 28, followed by a Blu-ray, DVD, and 4K UHD release on December 12.

== Reception ==
=== Box office ===
Five Nights at Freddy's grossed $137.3 million in the United States and Canada, and $159.9 million in other territories, for a worldwide total of $297.2 million. Deadline Hollywood calculated the net profit of the film to be $161 million.

In the United States and Canada, Five Nights at Freddy's was released alongside Freelance and After Death, and was initially projected to gross around $50 million from 3,675 theaters in its opening weekend. After making $39.7 million on its first day (including $10.3 million from Thursday night previews, the biggest-ever for a film with a simultaneous streaming release), estimates were raised to $78 million. It ended up debuting to $80 million (58.3% of total gross), topping the box office. The film had the second-best day and date opening weekend ever (behind Black Widow's $80.3 million in 2021), the best opening weekend for a horror film in 2023, the best opening from Blumhouse, topping Halloween's $76.2 million, and the second-highest opening for a video game film in 2023 behind The Super Mario Bros. Movie's $146.4 million the previous April. The film remained in first place the following weekend with $19 million, though the 76% drop was one of the largest of all time. On its seventh weekend, the film surpassed Split ($279 million) to become Blumhouse's highest-grossing release worldwide until it was surpassed by Obsession. Five Nights at Freddy's completed its theatrical run in the United States and Canada on December 21, 2023.

=== Critical response ===
Five Nights at Freddy's received generally negative reviews from critics. On the review aggregator website Rotten Tomatoes, 33% of 215 critics' reviews are positive, with an average rating of 4.7/10. The website's consensus reads: "Loaded with Easter eggs, Five Nights at Freddy's may be fun to watch for fans of the game, but most viewers of any other persuasion will find this adaptation muddled and decidedly unscary." Metacritic, which uses a weighted average, assigned the film a score of 33 out of 100, based on 38 critics, indicating "generally unfavorable" reviews. Audiences surveyed by CinemaScore gave the film an average grade of "A−" on an A+ to F scale, while those polled at PostTrak gave it a 77% overall positive score.

Murtada Elfadl of Variety felt the animatronic characters were underutilized, with the film instead focusing on "a baffling plot and backstory for their protagonist". He also criticized a perceived lack of effective jump scares and concluded, "In trying to adapt the game for the screen, they forgot what makes the original special, wringing unintentional laughter from its bizarre story instead of entertaining audiences". Dylan Roth of The New York Observer gave the film a score of one out of five and wrote, "There are jump scares, but no real thrills. There are jokes, but no genuine laughs".

The Guardian's Benjamin Lee gave a two out of five rating, arguing "The low-stakes, late-night thrill we expect from the material never arrives, held back by a mixture of indecisive restraint and misplaced self-importance. Five Nights at Freddy's is somehow a slog to get through and will be promptly forgotten by morning". The New York Times's Natalia Winkelmann expressed similar criticisms: "...[Although] Five Nights at Freddy's, based on a popular video game franchise, reaches for horror-comedy flair, this dreary, mild adaptation never achieves the hybrid pleasures of a movie like M3GAN. You may chuckle, but it's hard to tell if the movie is laughing with you". RogerEbert.com's Simon Abrams, giving a two out of four rating, was also negative: "Five Nights at Freddy's has most of the right elements for a good post-Amblin kiddy fright-fest, except maybe good dialogue and distinct characters. Watching the movie, one gets the sense that the games' morbid personality has been sanded down to its most generic jump-scares and banal revelations". Kevin Maher of The Times gave the film a rating of one out of five and said, "Like Teletubbies with chainsaws, or knife-wielding Fimbles, it's absurd. But not in a good way".

Meagan Navarro of Bloody Disgusting gave a score of three out of five and wrote, "It's the type of handsomely made, charming creature feature that'll play well at slumber parties or rowdy theaters full of obsessed fans, which is precisely its target audience. Five Nights at Freddy's won't scare the pants off of seasoned horror fans; the animatronic denizens of Freddy Fazbear's Pizzeria will likely make you want to hug them instead". Total Film's Neil Smith scored the film a two out of five and ended his review, "With robot heads containing flesh-mangling chainsaws, faces resembling that of battle-scarred Terminators, and the lumbering gait of Romero zombies, Freddy Fazbear and his pals would seem precision-tooled for terror. Sadly, though, they are about as scary as Barney the purple dinosaur in what is ultimately a ploddingly predictable, gore-lite yawner".

Mark Kennedy of the Associated Press stated: "Caught between PG and R, as well as lost at the crossroads of inadvertent comedy and horror, the PG-13 Five Nights at Freddy's has to go down as one of the poorest films in any genre this year". Similarly, the Chicago Tribune's Michael Phillips condemned "the film's attempt to be a cuddly version of Saw, with faces getting sliced open by a robo-critter's whirring saw blades", going on to say "To keep the PG-13 rating intact, the camera and editor cut away just before the splurch, nearly every time... The premise, meantime, of Five Nights at Freddy's... very likely would've made more sense as a straight-up R-rated splatterfest".

=== Accolades ===
Accolades received by Five Nights at Freddy's
Award	Date of ceremony	Category	Recipient(s)	Result	Ref.
People's Choice Awards	February 18, 2024	The Drama Movie of the Year	Five Nights at Freddy's	Nominated	
Golden Raspberry Awards	March 9, 2024	Worst Supporting Actress	Mary Stuart Masterson	Nominated	

== Sequel ==
In August 2018, Cawthon said that if the first film were to be successful, there could be a second film that follows the events of the second game. In January 2023, in an interview on the podcast WeeklyMTG, Lillard revealed that he signed a three-picture deal with the studios. In January 2024, despite Blumhouse's vice president of feature film development Ryan Turek claiming a sequel was not yet green-lit, Hutcherson revealed the sequel was in development. In April 2024, Blumhouse officially confirmed the sequel, and that Jim Henson's Creature Shop would return to design animatronics for the film.

Filming for the sequel began in the fall of 2024 in Louisiana. In October 2024, a teaser poster for the film was revealed, showing the character Toy Freddy with the number 2 and the film's release date. Five Nights at Freddy's 2 was released on December 5, 2025.

== See also ==
- List of films based on video games
- Willy's Wonderland
- The Banana Splits Movie
