= List of Five Nights at Freddy's media =

Media in the Five Nights at Freddy's franchise

Five Nights at Freddy's
- Official Five Nights at Freddy's franchise logo
- Created by: Scott Cawthon
- Original work: Five Nights at Freddy's
- Owner: ScottGames
- Years: 2014 – present

Major game releases
| 2014 | Five Nights at Freddy's |
| 2014 | Five Nights at Freddy's 2 |
| 2015 | Five Nights at Freddy's 3 |
| 2015 | Five Nights at Freddy's 4 |
| 2016 | FNaF World |
| 2016 | Five Nights at Freddy's: Sister Location |
| 2017 | Freddy Fazbear's Pizzeria Simulator |
| 2018 | Ultimate Custom Night |
| 2019 | Five Nights at Freddy's: Help Wanted |
| 2019 | Five Nights at Freddy's AR: Special Delivery |
2020
| 2021 | Five Nights at Freddy's: Security Breach |
2022
| 2023 | Five Nights at Freddy's: Help Wanted 2 |
| 2024 | Five Nights at Freddy's: Into the Pit |
| 2025 | Five Nights at Freddy's: Secret of the Mimic |

Five Nights at Freddy's (FNaF) is an American multimedia horror franchise created and owned by Scott Cawthon. The franchise began with the release of its first video game on August 8, 2014. Three sequels were released up to July 2015, setting a Guinness World Record for "most video game sequels released in a year". The first seven games were independently developed and published by Cawthon, while he partnered with Steel Wool Studios for the Help Wanted VR sub-series and Five Nights at Freddy's: Security Breach (2021). Six spin-off games have also been released, excluding troll games, and the series has inspired numerous fangames, the most prominent of which were later absorbed into the franchise as official spin-offs under The Fazbear Fanverse Initiative.

Beginning with Five Nights at Freddy's: The Silver Eyes, Cawthon and Kira Breed-Weasley co-wrote a novel trilogy for the franchise from 2015 to 2018, transitioning the franchise into a multimedia one. The trilogy was later followed by a short story anthology series titled Fazbear Frights and later its sequel series Tales from the Pizzaplex. Other print publication such as an in-universe activity book, cookbook, graphic novel adaptations of the novels and a series of guide books were also published. A film adaptation directed by Emma Tammi was released on October 27, 2023, with a sequel released on December 5, 2025.

== Video games ==
=== Core series ===
The main series of video games developed by or directly under Scott Cawthon, composing the franchise's primary canon. They are the most well known works in the franchise.

The titles are divided into two eras: "classic" era, encompassing the first seven installments developed solely by Cawthon, and the "modern" or "Steel Wool" era, developed by Steel Wool Studios, Inc.

| Game | Details |
|---|---|
| Five Nights at Freddy's Original release date: WW: August 8, 2014 | Release years by system: 2014 – Microsoft Windows, Android, iOS, Windows Phone 2019 – PlayStation 4, Xbox One, Nintendo Switch |
| Five Nights at Freddy's Original release date: WW: August 8, 2014 | Notes: Alternatively known as Five Nights at Freddy's 1.; In 2019, the Android and iOS ports were remastered by Clickteam. |
| Five Nights at Freddy's 2 Original release date: WW: November 11, 2014 | Release years by system: 2014 – Microsoft Windows, Android, iOS, Windows Phone 2019 – PlayStation 4, Xbox One, Nintendo Switch |
| Five Nights at Freddy's 2 Original release date: WW: November 11, 2014 | Notes: In 2019, the Android and iOS ports were remastered by Clickteam. |
| Five Nights at Freddy's 3 Original release date: WW: March 2, 2015 | Release years by system: 2015 – Microsoft Windows, Android, iOS 2019 – PlayStation 4, Xbox One, Nintendo Switch |
| Five Nights at Freddy's 3 Original release date: WW: March 2, 2015 | Notes: In 2019 the Android and iOS ports were remastered by Clickteam. |
| Five Nights at Freddy's 4 Original release date: WW: July 23, 2015 | Release years by system: 2015 – Microsoft Windows, Android, iOS 2019 – PlayStation 4, Xbox One, Nintendo Switch |
| Five Nights at Freddy's 4 Original release date: WW: July 23, 2015 | Notes: Originally titled Five Nights at Freddy's: The Final Chapter.; In 2019 the Android and iOS ports were remastered by Clickteam. |
| Five Nights at Freddy's: Sister Location Original release date: WW: October 7, 2016 | Release years by system: 2016 – Microsoft Windows, Android 2017 – iOS 2020 – Xbox One, Nintendo Switch, PlayStation 4 |
| Five Nights at Freddy's: Sister Location Original release date: WW: October 7, 2016 | Notes: In 2020 the Android and iOS ports were remastered by Clickteam; Often referred to as Five Nights at Freddy's 5. |
| Freddy Fazbear's Pizzeria Simulator Original release date: WW: December 4, 2017 | Release years by system: 2017 – Microsoft Windows 2019 – Android, iOS 2020 – Xbox One, Nintendo Switch 2021 – PlayStation 4 |
| Freddy Fazbear's Pizzeria Simulator Original release date: WW: December 4, 2017 | Notes: Alternatively known as Five Nights at Freddy's 6, or Five Nights at Freddy's 6: Pizzeria Simulator. |
| Ultimate Custom Night Original release date: WW: June 27, 2018 | Release years by system: 2018 – Microsoft Windows 2020 – Android, iOS 2021 – PlayStation 4, Xbox One, Nintendo Switch |
| Ultimate Custom Night Original release date: WW: June 27, 2018 | Notes: Originally set as a DLC to Pizzeria Simulator. |
| Five Nights at Freddy's: Help Wanted Original release date: WW: May 28, 2019 | Release years by system: 2019 – Microsoft Windows, PlayStation 4 2020 – Nintendo Switch, Oculus Quest, Android, iOS, Xbox One |
| Five Nights at Freddy's: Help Wanted Original release date: WW: May 28, 2019 | Notes: Alternatively known as Five Nights at Freddy's VR: Help Wanted.; Downloadable content, titled "Curse of Dreadbear", released October 23, 2019. |
| Five Nights at Freddy's: Security Breach Original release dates: WW: December 16, 2021 | Release years by system: 2021 – Microsoft Windows, PlayStation 4, PlayStation 5 2022 – Google Stadia, Xbox One, Xbox Series X/S 2023 – Nintendo Switch |
| Five Nights at Freddy's: Security Breach Original release dates: WW: December 16, 2021 | Notes: Downloadable content, titled "Ruin", first released on Steam on July 25, 2023.; "Collector's Edition" was released on December 6, 2022. |
| Five Nights at Freddy's: Help Wanted 2 Original release date: WW: December 14, 2023 | Release years by system: 2023 – Microsoft Windows, PlayStation VR2 2024 – PlayStation 5, Nintendo Switch |
| Five Nights at Freddy's: Help Wanted 2 Original release date: WW: December 14, 2023 | Notes: Originally announced on May 24, 2023. |
| Five Nights at Freddy's: Secret of the Mimic Original release date: June 13, 2025 | Release years by system: 2025 – Microsoft Windows, PlayStation 5, Xbox Series X |

=== Spin-offs ===
==== Major titles ====
| Game | Details |
|---|---|
| FNaF World Original release date: WW: January 21, 2016 | Release years by system: 2016 – Microsoft Windows 2017 – Android |
| FNaF World Original release date: WW: January 21, 2016 | Notes: The game was removed from Steam on January 25, 2016.; The Android port was removed from Google Play January 13, 2017, one day after it was released. |
| Five Nights at Freddy's: Special Delivery Original release date: WW: November 25, 2019 | Release years by system: 2019 – Android, iOS |
| Five Nights at Freddy's: Special Delivery Original release date: WW: November 25, 2019 | Notes: Alternatively known as Five Nights at Freddy's AR. |
| Five Nights at Freddy's: Into the Pit Original release date: WW: August 7, 2024 | Release years by system: 2024 – Microsoft Windows, PlayStation 4, PlayStation 5, Xbox One, Xbox Series X/S, Nintendo Switch |
| Five Nights at Freddy's: Into the Pit Original release date: WW: August 7, 2024 | Notes: Adaptation of a Fazbear Frights short story of the same name.; "Exclusive Edition" released on June 20, 2025. |
| Untitled Five Nights at Freddy's AAA Game Proposed release date: TBA | Proposed system release: TBA |
| Untitled Five Nights at Freddy's AAA Game Proposed release date: TBA | Notes: Possibly canceled. |

==== Freddy in Space series ====
A spin-off series of space-themed 2D sidescrollers. The series is sequel to a FNaF World minigame "Five Nights at Freddy's 57: Freddy in Space", hence it beginning with Freddy in Space 2.

| Game | Details |
|---|---|
| Freddy in Space 2 Original release date: WW: December 3, 2019 | Release years by system: 2019 – Microsoft Windows |
| Freddy in Space 3: Chica in Space Original release date: WW: October 18, 2023 | Release years by system: 2023 – Microsoft Windows |
| Freddy in Space 3: Chica in Space Original release date: WW: October 18, 2023 | Notes: Released under the title FNAF: The Movie: The Game as a troll game. |

The original minigame was a reference to a supposed 57th core series entry under that same title — Five Nights at Freddy's 57: Freddy in Space — announced for a 2031 release on April Fools' Day 2016.

==== Standalone ====
| Game | Details |
|---|---|
| Security Breach: Fury's Rage Original release date: WW: April 28, 2021 | Release years by system: 2021 – Microsoft Windows |
| Youtooz Presents: Five Nights at Freddy's Original release date: WW: April 29, 2022 | Release years by system: 2022 – Android, iOS |
| Five Laps at Freddy's Proposed release date: ~2026 | Proposed system release: 2026 |
| Five Nights at Freddy's: Survival Crew Proposed release date: TBA | Proposed system release: TBA - Microsoft Windows |
| Five Nights at Freddy's: Survival Crew Proposed release date: TBA | Notes: Developed by Metaverse Team Frights using Roblox Studios.; Accidentally released December 20, 2023. Taken down two hours after its release. |
| Five Nights at Freddy's: Into Madness Proposed release date: TBA | Proposed system release: TBA |
| Five Nights at Freddy's: Into Madness Proposed release date: TBA | Notes: Possibly canceled. |

=== Fazbear Fanverse Initiative ===
==== Five Nights at Candy's ====
| Game | Details |
|---|---|
| Five Nights at Candy's DX Proposed release date: TBA | Proposed system release: TBA – Microsoft Windows, Consoles, Mobile devices |
| Five Nights at Candy's DX Proposed release date: TBA | Notes: This title originally released on July 18, 2015, as a fangame, with a remake released on August 14, 2019, before the series' absorption into the official franchise under the Fazbear Fanverse Initiative. |
| Five Nights at Candy's 2 DX Proposed release date: TBA | Proposed system release: TBA – Microsoft Windows, Consoles, Mobile devices |
| Five Nights at Candy's 2 DX Proposed release date: TBA | Notes: This title originally released on February 28th, 2016 as a fangame, before the series' absorption into the official franchise under the Fazbear Fanverse Initiative. |
| Five Nights at Candy's 3 DX Proposed release date: TBA | Proposed system release: TBA – Microsoft Windows, Consoles, Mobile devices |
| Five Nights at Candy's 3 DX Proposed release date: TBA | Notes: This title originally released on March 5th, 2017 as a fangame, before the series' absorption into the official franchise under the Fazbear Fanverse Initiative. |
| FNAC FUR Proposed release date: TBA | Proposed system release: TBA – Microsoft Windows |
| Five Nights at Candy's 4 Proposed release date: TBA | Proposed system release: TBA – Microsoft Windows, Consoles, Mobile devices |

==== POPGOES ====
| Game | Details |
|---|---|
| POPGOES Arcade Original release date: WW: July 1, 2022 | Release years by system: 2022 – Microsoft Windows TBA – Console, Mobile device |
| POPGOES Arcade Original release date: WW: July 1, 2022 | Notes: Alternatively known as Five Nights at Freddy's: POPGOES Arcade.; This title originally released on June 12, 2020 under the name of POPGOES Arcade 2020 Edition as a fangame, before the series' absorption into the official franchise under the Fazbear Fanverse Initiative.; This title is a reimagining of Kane Carter's two older fangames, titled POPGOES Arcade (2016) and POPGOES Arcade 2. |
| myPOPGOES Original release date: WW: August 1, 2024 | Release years by system: 2024 – Microsoft Windows |
| myPOPGOES Original release date: WW: August 1, 2024 | Notes: Originally titled Toy.; Pitch demo for the title originally released on April 8, 2023. |
| POPGOES Evergreen Proposed release date: TBA | Proposed system release: TBA – Microsoft Windows, Console, Mobile device |
| POPGOES Evergreen Proposed release date: TBA | Notes: This title was originally announced as a fangame, before the series' absorption into the official franchise under the Fazbear Fanverse Initiative.; This title is a reimagining of Kane Carter's older fangame, titled POPGOES. |

==== One Night at Flumpty's ====
| Game | Details |
|---|---|
| One Night at Flumpty's Original release date: WW: August 22, 2020 | Release years by system: 2020 – Microsoft Windows, Android, iOS |
| One Night at Flumpty's Original release date: WW: August 22, 2020 | Notes: This title originally released on January 28, 2015, as a fangame, before the series' absorption into the official franchise under the Fazbear Fanverse Initiative. |
| One Night at Flumpty's 2 Original release date: WW: August 22, 2020 | Release years by system: 2020 – Microsoft Windows 2021 – Android, iOS |
| One Night at Flumpty's 2 Original release date: WW: August 22, 2020 | Notes: This title originally released on April 11, 2015, as a fangame, before the series' absorption into the official franchise under the Fazbear Fanverse Initiative. |
| One Night at Flumpty's 3 Original release date: WW: October 31, 2021 | Release years by system: 2021 – Microsoft Windows, Android, iOS |

==== Standalone ====
| Game | Details |
|---|---|
| THE JOY OF CREATION Proposed release date: TBA | Proposed system release: TBA – Microsoft Windows |
| THE JOY OF CREATION Proposed release date: TBA | Notes: This title was originally a collection of remakes of Nick Sita's older fangame series, consisting of The Joy of Creation: Reborn and The Joy of Creation: Story Mode. |

=== Troll games ===
| Game | Details |
|---|---|
| Five Nights at Freddy's 3 (Troll Game) Original release date: WW: February 15, 2015 | Release years by system: 2015 – Microsoft Windows |
| Five Nights at Freddy's 3 (Troll Game) Original release date: WW: February 15, 2015 | Notes: The game's page has been removed a few hours after its upload with no official re-releases. |
| FNaF World: Halloween Edition Original release date: WW: October 28, 2015 | Release years by system: 2015 – Microsoft Windows |
| FNaF World: Halloween Edition Original release date: WW: October 28, 2015 | Notes: The game's page has been removed a few hours after its upload with no official re-releases. |
| Sister Location: MA Original release date: WW: October 6, 2016 | Release years by system: 2016 – Microsoft Windows |
| Ultimate Custom Night Demo Proposed release date: WW: June 21, 2018 | Proposed system release: 2018 – Microsoft Windows |
| One Night at Flumpty's 2 (April Fools Edition) Original release date: WW: October 31, 2020 | Release years by system: 2022 – Microsoft Windows |
| One Night at Flumpty's 2 (April Fools Edition) Original release date: WW: October 31, 2020 | Notes: This title originally released on April 1, 2015, as a fangame, before the series' absorption into the official franchise under the Fazbear Fanverse Initiative. |
| Five Nights at Freddy's Plus: Exclusive Demo Original release date: WW: December 29, 2022 | Release years by system: 2022 – Microsoft Windows |

=== Compilations ===
| Game | Details |
|---|---|
| Five Nights at Freddy's: Original Series Original release date: WW: October 29, 2020 | Release years by system: 2020 – Xbox One |
| Five Nights at Freddy's: Core Collection Original release date: WW: January 12, 2021 | Release years by system: 2021 – PlayStation 4, Xbox One, Nintendo Switch |
| Five Nights at Freddy's: Core Collection Original release date: WW: January 12, 2021 | Notes: This compilation was released in physical format. |
| One Night at Flumpty's: The Egg Collection Proposed release date: TBA | Proposed system release: TBA – PlayStation 4, Xbox One, Nintendo Switch |
| One Night at Flumpty's: The Egg Collection Proposed release date: TBA | Notes: Presumed canceled. |

=== Crossover games ===
| Game | Details |
|---|---|
| Creepy Castle Original release date: WW: October 31, 2016 | Release years by system: 2016 – Microsoft Windows |
| Creepy Castle Original release date: WW: October 31, 2016 | Notes: Chica appears in the game as a secret boss and an unlockable playable character. |
| Rec Room Original release date: WW: June 1, 2016 | Release years by system: 2016 – Microsoft Windows |
| Rec Room Original release date: WW: June 1, 2016 | Notes: A limited-time Five Nights at Freddy's: Special Delivery themed wearable hoodie item was redeemable from July 3 through July 5, 2020. |
| Funko Fusion Original release date: WW: September 13, 2024 | Release years by system: 2024 – Microsoft Windows, Nintendo Switch, PlayStation 4, PlayStation 5, Xbox One, Xbox Series X/S |
| Funko Fusion Original release date: WW: September 13, 2024 | Notes: Freddy Fazbear and Foxy are included as playable characters, along with their Blacklight variants.; Freddy Fazbear's Pizza Place appears as a playable level.; An official Funko Pop! of Freddy Fazbear based on his zombie chaser variant from Funko Fusion will release in the summer of 2025. |
| Dead by Daylight Chapter XXXVI: Five Nights at Freddy's Original release date: WW: June 17, 2025 | Release years by system: 2025 – PlayStation 4, PlayStation 5, Nintendo Switch, Windows, Xbox One, Xbox Series X/S |
| Dead by Daylight Chapter XXXVI: Five Nights at Freddy's Original release date: WW: June 17, 2025 | Notes: Springtrap appears as a playable "killer" character.; Freddy Fazbear's Pizza appears as a playable map, with Freddy Fazbear, Bonnie and Chica appearing as props. |
| The Haunted Fanta Factory Original release date: WW: September 22, 2025 | Release years by system: 2025 – Android, iOS |
| The Haunted Fanta Factory Original release date: WW: September 22, 2025 | Notes: Promotional mobile game created by The Coca-Cola Company for the 2025 Halloween season; Freddy Fazbear appears as an enemy in two levels. |

=== Canceled games ===
| Game | Details |
|---|---|
| Five Nights at Freddy's Plus Cancellation date: August 5, 2023 | Proposed system release: 2023 – Microsoft Windows, Consoles and Mobile devices |
| Five Nights at Freddy's Plus Cancellation date: August 5, 2023 | Notes: The title was quietly canceled, with Morg first announcing his own contract's termination on August 4, 2023, the game's steam page being privated on August 5, 2023, its YouTube and X accounts being privated August 10, 2023 and finally the steam page being completely removed on August 27, 2023. Despite lack of an official cancelation announcement, Morg has referred to the title as "cancelled" on his social media. |

== Print publications ==
=== Novels ===
==== Five Nights at Freddy's trilogy ====
| Title | Release | Writers | Audiobook |
|---|---|---|---|
| Five Nights at Freddy's: The Silver Eyes | December 17, 2015 (original release); September 27, 2016 (re-release) | Scott Cawthon and Kira Breed Wisley | Suzanne Elise Freeman |
| Five Nights at Freddy's: The Twisted Ones | June 27, 2017 | Scott Cawthon and Kira Breed Wisley | Suzanne Elise Freeman |
| Five Nights at Freddy's: The Fourth Closet | June 26, 2018 | Scott Cawthon and Kira Breed Wisley | Suzanne Elise Freeman |

==== Short story anthologies ====
| Volume | | Release | Short stories | Writers | Epil. | Audiobook |
| No. | Title | Release | Short stories | Writers | Epil. | Audiobook |
Fazbear Frights
| 1 | "Into the Pit" | December 26, 2019 | "Into the Pit" | Scott Cawthon | "Stitchwraith Stingers" | Suzanne Elise Freeman |
| 1 | "Into the Pit" | December 26, 2019 | "To Be Beautiful" | Scott Cawthon and Elley Cooper | "Stitchwraith Stingers" | Suzanne Elise Freeman |
| 1 | "Into the Pit" | December 26, 2019 | "Count the Ways" | Scott Cawthon and Elley Cooper | "Stitchwraith Stingers" | Suzanne Elise Freeman |
| 2 | "Fetch" | March 3, 2020 | "Fetch" | Scott Cawthon and Carly Anne West | "Stitchwraith Stingers" | Suzanne Elise Freeman |
| 2 | "Fetch" | March 3, 2020 | "Lonely Freddy" | Scott Cawthon and Andrea Waggener | "Stitchwraith Stingers" | Suzanne Elise Freeman |
| 2 | "Fetch" | March 3, 2020 | "Out of Stock" | Scott Cawthon and Carly Anne West | "Stitchwraith Stingers" | Suzanne Elise Freeman |
| 3 | "1:35 A.M." | May 5, 2020 | "1:35 A.M." | Scott Cawthon and Elley Cooper | "Stitchwraith Stingers" | Suzanne Elise Freeman |
| 3 | "1:35 A.M." | May 5, 2020 | "Room for One More" | Scott Cawthon and Andrea Waggener | "Stitchwraith Stingers" | Suzanne Elise Freeman |
| 3 | "1:35 A.M." | May 5, 2020 | "The New Kid" | Scott Cawthon and Andrea Waggener | "Stitchwraith Stingers" | Suzanne Elise Freeman |
| 4 | "Step Closer" | July 7, 2020 | "Step Closer" | Scott Cawthon and Kelly Parra | "Stitchwraith Stingers" | Suzanne Elise Freeman |
| 4 | "Step Closer" | July 7, 2020 | "Dance with Me" | Scott Cawthon and either Elley Cooper or Andrea Waggener | "Stitchwraith Stingers" | Suzanne Elise Freeman |
| 4 | "Step Closer" | July 7, 2020 | "Coming Home" | Scott Cawthon and either Elley Cooper or Andrea Waggener | "Stitchwraith Stingers" | Suzanne Elise Freeman |
| 5 | "Bunny Call" | September 1, 2020 | "Bunny Call" | Scott Cawthon and Andrea Waggener | "Stitchwraith Stingers" | Suzanne Elise Freeman |
| 5 | "Bunny Call" | September 1, 2020 | "In the Flesh" | Scott Cawthon and Elley Cooper | "Stitchwraith Stingers" | Suzanne Elise Freeman |
| 5 | "Bunny Call" | September 1, 2020 | "The Man in Room 1280" | Scott Cawthon and Andrea Waggener | "Stitchwraith Stingers" | Suzanne Elise Freeman |
| 6 | "Blackbird" | December 29, 2020 | "Blackbird" | Scott Cawthon and Andrea Waggener | "Stitchwraith Stingers" | Suzanne Elise Freeman |
| 6 | "Blackbird" | December 29, 2020 | "The Real Jake" | Scott Cawthon and Andrea Waggener | "Stitchwraith Stingers" | Suzanne Elise Freeman |
| 6 | "Blackbird" | December 29, 2020 | "Hide-and-Seek" | Scott Cawthon and Kelly Parra | "Stitchwraith Stingers" | Suzanne Elise Freeman |
| 7 | "The Cliffs" | March 2, 2021 | "The Cliffs" | Scott Cawthon and Elley Cooper | "Stitchwraith Stingers" | Suzanne Elise Freeman |
| 7 | "The Cliffs" | March 2, 2021 | "The Breaking Wheel" | Scott Cawthon and Andrea Waggener | "Stitchwraith Stingers" | Suzanne Elise Freeman |
| 7 | "The Cliffs" | March 2, 2021 | "He Told Me Everything" | Scott Cawthon and Elley Cooper | "Stitchwraith Stingers" | Suzanne Elise Freeman |
| 8 | "Gumdrop Angel" | May 4, 2021 | "Gumdrop Angel" | Scott Cawthon and Andrea Waggener | "Stitchwraith Stingers" | Suzanne Elise Freeman |
| 8 | "Gumdrop Angel" | May 4, 2021 | "Sergio's Lucky Day" | Scott Cawthon and Andrea Waggener | "Stitchwraith Stingers" | Suzanne Elise Freeman |
| 8 | "Gumdrop Angel" | May 4, 2021 | "What We Found" | Scott Cawthon and Andrea Waggener | "Stitchwraith Stingers" | Suzanne Elise Freeman |
| 9 | "The Puppet Carver" | July 6, 2021 | "The Puppet Carver" | Scott Cawthon and Elley Cooper | "Stitchwraith Stingers" | Suzanne Elise Freeman |
| 9 | "The Puppet Carver" | July 6, 2021 | "Jump for Tickets" | Scott Cawthon and Elley Cooper | "Stitchwraith Stingers" | Suzanne Elise Freeman |
| 9 | "The Puppet Carver" | July 6, 2021 | "Pizza Kit" | Scott Cawthon and Elley Cooper | "Stitchwraith Stingers" | Suzanne Elise Freeman |
| 10 | "Friendly Face" | September 7, 2021 | "Friendly Face" | Scott Cawthon and Andrea Waggener | "Stitchwraith Stingers" | Suzanne Elise Freeman |
| 10 | "Friendly Face" | September 7, 2021 | "Sea Bonnies" | Scott Cawthon and Andrea Waggener | "Stitchwraith Stingers" | Suzanne Elise Freeman |
| 10 | "Friendly Face" | September 7, 2021 | "Together Forever" | Scott Cawthon and Andrea Waggener | "Stitchwraith Stingers" | Suzanne Elise Freeman |
| 11 | "Prankster" | November 2, 2021 | "Prankster" | Scott Cawthon and Elley Cooper | "Stitchwraith Stingers" | Suzanne Elise Freeman |
| 11 | "Prankster" | November 2, 2021 | "Kids at Play" | Scott Cawthon and Andrea Waggener | "Stitchwraith Stingers" | Suzanne Elise Freeman |
| 11 | "Prankster" | November 2, 2021 | "Find Player Two!" | Scott Cawthon and Andrea Waggener | "Stitchwraith Stingers" | Suzanne Elise Freeman |
| 12 | "Felix the Shark" | April 19, 2022 | "Felix the Shark" | Scott Cawthon and Andrea Waggener | None | Suzanne Elise Freeman |
| 12 | "Felix the Shark" | April 19, 2022 | "The Scoop" | Scott Cawthon and Kelly Parra | None | Suzanne Elise Freeman |
| 12 | "Felix the Shark" | April 19, 2022 | "You're the Band" | Scott Cawthon and Elley Cooper | None | Suzanne Elise Freeman |
Tales from the Pizzaplex
| 1 | "Lally's Game" | July 19, 2022 | "Frailty" | Scott Cawthon and Kelly Parra | Untitled | Suzanne Elise Freeman |
| 1 | "Lally's Game" | July 19, 2022 | "Lally's Game" | Scott Cawthon and Andrea Waggener | Untitled | Suzanne Elise Freeman |
| 1 | "Lally's Game" | July 19, 2022 | "Under Construction" | Scott Cawthon and Andrea Waggener | Untitled | Suzanne Elise Freeman |
| 2 | "HAPPS" | September 20, 2022 | "Help Wanted" | Scott Cawthon and Elley Cooper | Untitled | Suzanne Elise Freeman |
| 2 | "HAPPS" | September 20, 2022 | "HAPPS" | Scott Cawthon and Andrea Waggener | Untitled | Suzanne Elise Freeman |
| 2 | "HAPPS" | September 20, 2022 | "B-7" | Scott Cawthon and Andrea Waggener | Untitled | Suzanne Elise Freeman |
| 3 | "Somniphobia" | December 6, 2022 | "Somniphobia" | Scott Cawthon and Kelly Parra | Untitled | Suzanne Elise Freeman |
| 3 | "Somniphobia" | December 6, 2022 | "Pressure" | Scott Cawthon and Andrea Waggener | Untitled | Suzanne Elise Freeman |
| 3 | "Somniphobia" | December 6, 2022 | "Cleithrophobia" | Scott Cawthon and Andrea Waggener | Untitled | Suzanne Elise Freeman |
| 4 | "Submechanophobia" | December 27, 2022 | "Submechanophobia" | Scott Cawthon and Kelly Parra | Untitled | Suzanne Elise Freeman |
| 4 | "Submechanophobia" | December 27, 2022 | "Animatronic Apocalypse" | Scott Cawthon and Kelly Parra | Untitled | Suzanne Elise Freeman |
| 4 | "Submechanophobia" | December 27, 2022 | "Bobbiedots, Part 1" | Scott Cawthon and Andrea Waggener | Untitled | Suzanne Elise Freeman |
| 5 | "The Bobbiedots Conclusion" | March 7, 2023 | "GGY" | Scott Cawthon and Andrea Waggener | Untitled | Suzanne Elise Freeman |
| 5 | "The Bobbiedots Conclusion" | March 7, 2023 | "The Storyteller" | Scott Cawthon and Andrea Waggener | Untitled | Suzanne Elise Freeman |
| 5 | "The Bobbiedots Conclusion" | March 7, 2023 | "Bobbiedots, Part 2" | Scott Cawthon and Andrea Waggener | Untitled | Suzanne Elise Freeman |
| 6 | "Nexie" | May 2, 2023 | "Nexie" | Scott Cawthon and Andrea Waggener | Untitled | Suzanne Elise Freeman |
| 6 | "Nexie" | May 2, 2023 | "Drowning" | Scott Cawthon and Kelly Parra | Untitled | Suzanne Elise Freeman |
| 6 | "Nexie" | May 2, 2023 | "The Mimic" | Scott Cawthon and Andrea Waggener | Untitled | Suzanne Elise Freeman |
| 7 | "Tiger Rock" | July 18, 2023 | "Tiger Rock" | Scott Cawthon and Andrea Waggener | Untitled | Suzanne Elise Freeman |
| 7 | "Tiger Rock" | July 18, 2023 | "The Monty Within" | Scott Cawthon and Andrea Waggener | Untitled | Suzanne Elise Freeman |
| 7 | "Tiger Rock" | July 18, 2023 | "Bleeding Heart" | Scott Cawthon and Kelly Parra | Untitled | Suzanne Elise Freeman |
| 8 | "B7-2" | October 3, 2023 | "B7-2" | Scott Cawthon and Andrea Waggener | Untitled | Suzanne Elise Freeman |
| 8 | "B7-2" | October 3, 2023 | "Alone Together" | Scott Cawthon and Kelly Parra | Untitled | Suzanne Elise Freeman |
| 8 | "B7-2" | October 3, 2023 | "Dittophobia" | Scott Cawthon and Andrea Waggener | Untitled | Suzanne Elise Freeman |
| ★ | | July 9, 2024 | "Monster" | Scott Cawthon and Andrea Waggener | N/A | None |

==== Interactive novels ====
| Title | Release | Writers |
|---|---|---|
| Five Nights at Freddy's: VIP | August 3, 2024 | Scott Cawthon and Eugene C. Myers |
| Five Nights at Freddy's: The Week Before | September 3, 2024 | Scott Cawthon and Eugene C. Myers |
| Five Nights at Freddy's: Return to the Pit | December 24, 2024 | Scott Cawthon and Adrienne Kress |
| Five Nights at Freddy's: Escape the Pizzaplex | April 1, 2025 | Scott Cawthon and Lyndsay Ely |

=== Unfiction ===
| Title | Release | Writer | Illustrator |
|---|---|---|---|
| Five Nights at Freddy's: Survival Logbook | December 26, 2017 | Scott Cawthon | Emese Szigetvári |
| Five Nights at Freddy's: Ticket to Fun | September 23, 2025 | Scott Cawthon | TBA |

=== Non-fiction ===
==== Guides ====
| Title | Release | Writer | Illustrator |
The Freddy Files
| Five Nights at Freddy's: The Freddy Files | August 29, 2017 | Scott Cawthon | Emese Szigetvári |
| Five Nights at Freddy's: The Freddy Files Updated Edition | June 25, 2019 | Scott Cawthon | Emese Szigetvári |
| Five Nights at Freddy's: The Ultimate Guide | December 7, 2021 | Scott Cawthon | Emese Szigetvári |
| Five Nights at Freddy's: Security Breach Files | September 20, 2022 | Scott Cawthon | Unknown |
| Five Nights at Freddy's: Security Breach Files Updated Edition | April 2, 2024 | Scott Cawthon | Unknown |
| Five Nights at Freddy's: Ultimate Guide 2.0 | December 2, 2025 | Scott Cawthon | TBA |
Other
| Five Nights at Freddy's Official Character Encyclopedia | February 7, 2023 | Scott Cawthon | Emese Szigetvári |
| Five Nights at Freddy's Official Character Encyclopedia: Updated Edition | December 29, 2026 | Scott Cawthon | TBA |

==== Art activity books ====
| Title | Release | Writer | Illustrator |
|---|---|---|---|
| Art with Edge, Five Nights at Freddy's | November 17, 2018 | Scott Cawthon | Emese Szigetvári |
| The Official Five Nights at Freddy's Coloring Book | January 2, 2021 | Scott Cawthon | Claudia Schröder |
| The Official Five Nights at Freddy's How to Draw | January 4, 2022 | Scott Cawthon | Claudia Schröder |
| The Official Five Nights at Freddy's Glow-in-the-Dark Coloring Book | August 6, 2024 | Scott Cawthon | Claudia Schröder |

==== Miscellaneous ====
| Title | Release | Writer | Illustrator |
|---|---|---|---|
| The Official Five Nights at Freddy's Cookbook | October 24, 2023 | Rob Morris and Kevin Pettman | Rob Morris (Photography) |
| The Official Five Nights at Freddy's Stickerpedia | May 6, 2025 | Scott Cawthon | TBA |
| The Official Art and Making of the Movies | November 3, 2026 | Scott Cawthon and Cala Spinner | TBA |
| The Official Five Nights at Freddy's Dessert Book | July 6, 2027 | Scott Cawthon | TBA |

=== Adaptations ===
==== Film novelizations ====
| Title | Release | Adapted from | Adapted by | Audiobook |
|---|---|---|---|---|
| Five Nights at Freddy's: The Official Movie Novel | December 26, 2023 | Five Nights at Freddy's | Andrea Waggener | Suzanne Elise Freeman |
| Five Nights at Freddy's 2: The Official Movie Novel | May 5, 2026 | Five Nights at Freddy's 2 | Andrea Waggener | Suzanne Elise Freeman |

==== Graphic novel adaptations ====
| Vol. | Release | Adapted from | Adapted by | Illustration | Coloring | Cover |
Five Nights at Freddy's trilogy
| 1 | December 26, 2019 | Five Nights at Freddy's: The Silver Eyes | Claudia Schröder | | Laurie Smith | Claudia Schröder |
| 2 | February 2, 2021 | Five Nights at Freddy's: The Twisted Ones | Christopher Hastings | Claudia Aguirre | Laurie Smith and Eva de la Cruz | Claudia Aguirre |
| 3 | December 28, 2021 | Five Nights at Freddy's: The Fourth Closet | Christopher Hastings | Diana Camero | Eva de la Cruz | Diana Camero |
Fazbear Frights
| 1 | September 6, 2022 | "Into the Pit" | Christopher Hastings | Didi Esmeralda | Eva de la Cruz | Emese Szigetvári |
| 1 | September 6, 2022 | "To Be Beautiful" | Christopher Hastings | Anthony Morris Jr. | Ben Sawyer | Emese Szigetvári |
| 1 | September 6, 2022 | "Out of Stock" | Christopher Hastings | Andi Santagata | Gonzalo Duarte | Emese Szigetvári |
| 2 | March 7, 2023 | "Fetch" | Christopher Hastings | Didi Esmeralda | Eva de la Cruz | Emese Szigetvári |
| 2 | March 7, 2023 | "Room for One More" | Christopher Hastings | Anthony Morris Jr. | Ben Sawyer | Emese Szigetvári |
| 2 | March 7, 2023 | "The New Kid" | Christopher Hastings | Coryn MacPherson | Gonzalo Duarte | Emese Szigetvári |
| 3 | September 5, 2023 | "Step Closer" | Christopher Hastings | Didi Esmeralda | Ben Sawyer | Emese Szigetvári |
| 3 | September 5, 2023 | "Bunny Call" | Christopher Hastings | Coryn MacPherson | Gonzalo Duarte | Emese Szigetvári |
| 3 | September 5, 2023 | "Hide-and-Seek" | Christopher Hastings | Diana Camero | Judy Lai | Emese Szigetvári |
| 4 | December 16, 2023 | "The Breaking Wheel" | Christopher Hastings | Diana Camero | Judy Lai | Claudia Schröder |
| 4 | December 16, 2023 | "The Cliffs" | Christopher Hastings | Ben Sawyer | Eva de la Cruz | Claudia Schröder |
| 4 | December 16, 2023 | "Sergio's Lucky Day" | Christopher Hastings | Coryn MacPherson | Gonzalo Duarte | Claudia Schröder |
| 5 | September 3, 2024 | "Jump For Tickets" | Christopher Hastings | Diana Camero | Judy Lai | Diana Camero |
| 5 | September 3, 2024 | "Sea Bonnies" | Christopher Hastings | Coryn MacPherson | Gonzalo Duarte | Diana Camero |
| 5 | September 3, 2024 | "Find Player Two!" | Christopher Hastings | Benjamin Sawyer | Eva de la Cruz | Diana Camero |
Tales from the Pizzaplex
| 1 | March 4, 2025 | "Under Construction" | Christopher Hastings | Macky Pamintuan | Benjamin Sawyer | TBA |
| 1 | March 4, 2025 | "HAPPS" | Christopher Hastings | Coryn MacPherson | Gonzalo Duarte | TBA |
| 1 | March 4, 2025 | "Cleithrophobia" | Christopher Hastings | Diana Camero | Judy Lai | TBA |
| 2 | April 7, 2026 | "Pressure" | Christopher Hastings | Coryn MacPherson | TBA | TBA |
| 2 | April 7, 2026 | "Submechanophobia" | Christopher Hastings | Mike Anderson | TBA | TBA |
| 2 | April 7, 2026 | "The Mimic" | Christopher Hastings | Anthony Morris Jr | TBA | TBA |
| 3 | September 1, 2026 | "Nexie" | Christopher Hastings | Mike Anderson, Coryn MacPherson, and Anthony Morris Jr. | TBA | TBA |
| 3 | September 1, 2026 | "The Storyteller" | Christopher Hastings | Mike Anderson, Coryn MacPherson, and Anthony Morris Jr. | TBA | TBA |
| 3 | September 1, 2026 | "Drowning" | Christopher Hastings | Mike Anderson, Coryn MacPherson, and Anthony Morris Jr. | TBA | TBA |
| 4 | March 2, 2027 | "Tiger Rock" | Christopher Hastings | TBA | TBA | TBA |
| 4 | March 2, 2027 | "Dittophobia" | Christopher Hastings | TBA | TBA | TBA |
| 4 | March 2, 2027 | "Epilogue" | Christopher Hastings | TBA | TBA | TBA |

== Film ==
| Title | Release | Director | Screenwriter(s) | Producers | Ref. |
|---|---|---|---|---|---|
| Five Nights at Freddy's | October 25, 2023 (UK release); October 27, 2023 (US release) | Emma Tammi | Scott Cawthon, Seth Cuddeback, and Emma Tammi | Jason Blum and Scott Cawthon | |
| Five Nights at Freddy's 2 | December 5, 2025 | Emma Tammi | Scott Cawthon | Jason Blum and Scott Cawthon | |
| Five Nights at Freddy's 3 | TBA | | Gary Dauberman | Jason Blum and Scott Cawthon | |

== Tabletop games ==
=== Original ===
| Title | | Release | Designer | Artist | Publisher | Ref. |
|---|---|---|---|---|---|---|
| Five Nights at Freddy's (Jumpscare Game) | | August 2017 | - | - | Moose | |
| Five Nights at Freddy's: Survive 'Til 6AM | Original | October 26, 2020 | - | - | Funko Games | |
| Five Nights at Freddy's: Survive 'Til 6AM | Security Breach edition | August 29, 2023 | - | - | Funko Games | |
| Five Nights at Freddy's: Night of Frights! | | October 15, 2022 | Donovan Eberling | Thomas Ramey | Funko Games | |
| Five Nights at Freddy's: Scare-in-the-Box | | December 30, 2022 | Chris Rowlands | - | Funko Games | |
| Five Nights at Freddy's: FightLine | | October 1, 2023 | David Iezzi and Luke Turpeinen | Diana Camero | Funko Games | |

=== Licensed ===
| Title | | Release | Original game | Designer | Publisher |
|---|---|---|---|---|---|
| Monopoly: Five Nights at Freddy's | | May 25, 2018 | Monopoly | - | USAOPOLY |
| CLUE: Five Nights at Freddy's | | May 28, 2018 | CLUE | - | USAOPOLY |
| Something Wild!: Five Nights at Freddy's | Original | August 25, 2021 | Something Wild! | Luke Turpeinen | Funko Games |
| Something Wild!: Five Nights at Freddy's | Security Breach edition | February 9, 2024 | Something Wild! | - | Funko Games |
