= FNaF World =

2016 video game

- Steam storefront header
- Developer: Scott Cawthon
- Publisher: Scott Cawthon
- Composer: Leon Riskin
- Series: Five Nights at Freddy's
- Engine: Clickteam Fusion 2.5
- Platform: Windows Android
- Release: January 21, 2016
- Genre: Role-playing
- Mode: Single-player

FNaF World (Note: Also known as "Five Nights at Freddy's World") is a 2016 role-playing video game created by indie developer Scott Cawthon. It is the first official spin-off to the Five Nights at Freddy's series.

The game was initially released on Windows via Steam on January 21, 2016. The original Steam release was met with negative reviews and backlash because of the game's unfinished state and technical issues, leading Cawthon to temporarily remove it from the platform in order to address these issues. An updated version of the game was released on February 8, 2016, on Game Jolt as freeware. The game received mixed reviews from critics.

== Gameplay ==
An example of turn-based battle in FNaF World, showing a random encounter of the enemies.

FNaF World is a role-playing game. The player takes control of the characters from the Five Nights at Freddy's series. They starts by choosing two parties consisting of four characters each. The starter characters can all be swapped in and out of the party. As the player continues, they collect more characters to place in their party, with 48 characters being in total. The gameplay consists of exploring the game world and accessing new areas.

The battles consist of turn-based random encounters, with several boss battles. For each turn, the player is given choices for each character and must choose one of their three commands, which differ depending on the characters. The commands have different color tags and have different impacts, including healing the team, providing status buffs, single-target attacks, area attacks, poisonous attacks, instant-kill attacks etc. The player can also swap the current party during a battle at any time.

== Release and reception ==
FNaF World was announced by Scott Cawthon, on September 15, 2015, in a Steam post, later a trailer was uploaded to YouTube. The announcement was considered to be a hoax due to similar PR actions taken by Cawthon, however, it was not disproven until its release. Cawthon noted that the game is a spin-off, considering the main plotline of Five Nights at Freddy's completed with the fourth game. Originally planned for release on February 2, 2016, Cawthon later changed the date to January 22, 2016, only to end up releasing the game one day earlier, on January 21, via Steam.

Upon release, FNaF World received strong criticism for missing key features and its unstable and generally unfinished state, which Cawthon later apologized for, stating that "[he] got too eager to show the things that were finished, that [he] neglected to pay attention to the things that weren't." He agreed with the community that he had rushed the release, and that the game's rough state was unacceptable. Cawthon stated that he would be working hard to get the game in order, but this eventually led to Cawthon temporarily taking the game off Steam, offering refunds to everyone who bought it. It was later announced that, once the game would be patched further, it would be released as freeware, first to Game Jolt, and stay free from that point on. The Game Jolt version was released on February 8, 2016, and includes a new overworld and other features absent from the original release. A second update was released in May of that year.

=== Critical reception ===
Reception

Review scores
| Publication | Score |
|---|---|
| The Escapist | 3/5 |
| CD-Action | 3/10 |
| Softpedia | 3.5/5 |

Upon Steam's release, Angelo M. D'Argenio from The Escapist who reviewed upon release, stated that "Five Nights at Freddy's World is a retro parody JRPG that feels incomplete now, but is steadily getting better as patches come out".

Following its release on Game Jolt, Iza "9kier" Pogiernicka from the Polish gaming magazine CD-Action, was much more critical. In her review she called it "one of the worst gaming experiences, (she) had for a long time", describing some visual effects as "epilepsy inducing", the game's battles as too repetitive and too frequent, was extremely bothered by the amount of loading screens, and found it cumbersome that, its annoyingly hidden "secrets" were needed to finish the game.

Retrospectively, the writers of TheGamer criticised the game's lack of a story outside of minor lore implications, and its overworld, finding it "simplistic and forgettable".

== Sequel ==
On August 8th, 2026, during the Five Nights at Freddy's 12th Anniversary celebrations, Mega Cat Studios, which previously developed 2024's Five Nights at Freddy's: Into the Pit, posted a picture on their Twitter page, confirming that a sequel to FNaF World is currently in development.
