= Sarah Grueneberg =

American chef

- Born: Sarah Jayne Grueneberg; August 20, 1981 (age 44); Houston, Texas, United States
- Education: The Art Institute of Houston
- Culinary career
- Cooking style: Italian cuisine
- Rating: Michelin stars
- Current restaurant(s): Monteverde Restaurant & Pastificio
- Previous restaurant: Spiaggia
- Television shows: Top Chef; Iron Chef Gauntlet
- Award won: 2017 James Beard Foundation Award Best Chef Great Lakes
- Website: www.chefsarahjayne.com

Sarah Grueneberg is an American chef who is head chef and owner of Monteverde Restaurant & Pastificio in Chicago. While executive chef at Spiaggia, she held a Michelin star for three years. In 2017, she was named the 2017 Best Chefs in the Great Lakes at the James Beard Foundation Awards. Grueneberg came second in the ninth season of Top Chef; and she also appeared on the first season of Iron Chef Gauntlet.

== Career ==
Sarah Grueneberg was brought up in Houston, Texas. She took an interest in cooking with her German grandparents. She graduated from The Art Institute of Houston in 2001 with an associate degree in applied science.

Following graduation, she worked at Brennan's of Houston, becoming a sous chef in 2003. Grueneberg moved to join Spiaggia in 2005, under chef Tony Mantuano. She was promoted to purchasing sous chef in 2007, where she worked with executive chef Missy Robbins. Grueneberg was promoted to Chef di Cucina a year later, and in 2010 became executive chef. While she was running the kitchen at Spiaggia, it was awarded a Michelin star for three years in a row. Competing in series 9 of Bravo TV's Top Chef, she finished in second place.

Grueneberg opened her own restaurant, Monteverde Restaurant & Pastificio, in 2016. She had been planning it since 2013, with her friend Meg Sahs. The restaurant serves Italian cuisine. In 2017, she was nominated for the first time for a James Beard Foundation Award in the category of Best Chef Great Lakes, and won the award. Also that year, she appeared on the television series Iron Chef Gauntlet as one of the contestants.

She also won the first episode of the television series Beat Bobby Flay, which aired on August 24, 2013.
