= Scott Cawthon =

American video game developer (born 1978)

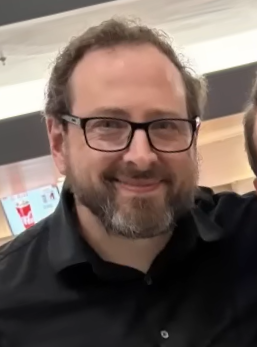
- Cawthon in 2025
- Born: Scott Braden Cawthon; June 4, 1978 (age 48); Houston, Texas, U.S.
- Other name: Animdude
- Occupations: Animator; video game developer; author; screenwriter; film producer
- Years active: 1994–present
- Notable work: Five Nights at Freddy's
- Children: 6
- Website: https://scottgames.com/

Scott Braden Cawthon (born June 4, 1978) is an American video game developer, writer, and producer best known for creating Five Nights at Freddy's, a series of horror video games which expanded into a media franchise.

Cawthon began his career developing family-friendly Christian video games to minimal success. He transitioned to horror in 2014 with the game Five Nights at Freddy's, which was a major commercial and critical success, leading to a franchise that gained a large fanbase. Cawthon has led development for eight games in the main series, as well as four spin-offs. Outside of the games, Cawthon wrote several stories, including novels and the screenplay for the Five Nights at Freddy's film (2023) and its sequel Five Nights at Freddy's 2 (2025), both of which he also produced.

In 2021, following extensive doxing and harassment incidents due to the publicization of his donations to the Republican Party, Cawthon announced his retirement and has since largely stepped away from game development, although still retaining exclusivity rights and overarching creative control over the Five Nights at Freddy's franchise.

== Life and career ==
Scott Braden Cawthon was born on June 4, 1978, in Houston, Texas, to Linda (née Friedrich) and Joseph H. Cawthon (1949–2019). He has one sister and one brother.

=== 1996–2014: Early work ===
As a Christian, Cawthon began his career in game development, making self-funded adventure-oriented Christian video games. Cawthon's first professional game was called Iffermoon. He attended the Art Institute of Houston in 1996, where he learned how to create computer graphics, and taught himself to develop games using the engine Clickteam Fusion. A member of a group of Christian artists known as Hope Animation, Cawthon also made animated Christian films.

Cawthon's religious projects included The Pilgrim's Progress: The Video Game (2011) and The Desolate Hope (2012). Based on the religious allegory, The Pilgrim's Progress: The Video Game is a role-playing video game with enemies such as Beelzebub, Apollyon, Shame, and Giant Despair. The Desolate Hope is a role-playing video game with platforming and top-down elements. Set in a "dark, brooding, and twisted industrial landscape", the dystopian story follows a robotic coffee pot who must rescue a fetus being used as a scientific specimen. Rock Paper Shotgun praised the game's art style, describing it as akin to a "glorious artifact from the nineties, hand-crafted [and] bizarre". Kill Screen wrote that the themes of adventure and the unique art style of Cawthon's early works would reappear in some of his later projects such as FNaF World (2016). After the release of Five Nights at Freddy's (2014), The Desolate Hope received both attention and criticism for the plot's perceived pro-life message, although Cawthon later clarified that the game "was not designed with abortion specifically in mind."

Cawthon's Christian games were generally well received but were not financially successful enough to support his wife and two children. He reluctantly stopped making religious games and instead produced cheap computer games and free-to-play mobile titles which could provide him with a steady source of income. Calum Marsh, in his profile of Cawthon for The New York Times, wrote that these games "might bring in $40 or $50 each month". He also took on programming and retail work.

In 2013, Cawthon submitted the family-friendly game Chipper & Sons Lumber Co. to Steam Greenlight. It was a resource management title featuring anthropomorphic animals; the player character was a beaver. However, players and reviewers such as James Stephanie Sterling ridiculed the game because they thought the characters were unintentionally "creepy" and resembled "scary" animatronics. One writer described it as an example of the uncanny valley.

Cawthon's financial situation and Chipper & Sons' criticism led to him becoming depressed. He thought that he had squandered his life by becoming a game developer and attempted to pursue other professions. Cawthon underwent a crisis of faith: "Either God didn't exist, or God hated me." When his life insurance policy got cancelled after the company found out that he had expressed suicidal ideation to his doctor, he realized that "now even my death had no value" and asked God to "use me somehow". With his faith restored, Cawthon took inspiration from Chipper & Sons' reception and decided to make something intentionally scarier. This was the impetus for Five Nights at Freddy's.

=== 2014–2021: Five Nights at Freddy's ===
==== Scott Cawthon–made games ====
The logo for Five Nights at Freddy's

Cawthon submitted Five Nights at Freddy's to Steam's Greenlight system in the summer of 2014, releasing a trailer and later a demo. He submitted it to IndieDB, where it gained popularity, and submitted the game a third time to Desura. The game was accepted on Steam's Greenlight in August 2014. The game was well received by critics, and became the subject of numerous popular Let's Play videos on YouTube. A prequel, Five Nights at Freddy's 2, was released later that year on Steam. Soon after the release of Five Nights at Freddy's 2, Cawthon removed all information from his personal website and replaced it with an image of the word "offline". His website later began to show teaser images promoting Five Nights at Freddy's 3, which was released in March 2015.

Five Nights at Freddy's 4 was released in July 2015, with a free Halloween update following. The development of a game, titled FNaF World, was announced, ditching the formula of the other games and instead being a role-playing video game. It was released on January 21, 2016. FNaF World received mixed reviews due to glitches and other issues, and Cawthon pulled it from Steam four days later. An altered version was released on Game Jolt for free on February 8.

On May 21, 2016, Cawthon released a teaser trailer for Five Nights at Freddy's: Sister Location. The game was released on October 7, 2016, and was generally well received. Cawthon released the update "Custom Night" on December 1, with "Golden Freddy Mode" being added to the update soon after.

On July 3, 2017, Cawthon announced the cancellation of a sixth main installment to Five Nights at Freddy's, after previously stating a month earlier that a sixth game was in development. He opined that he had been neglecting other aspects of his life but said that he was not planning to abandon the series and was considering developing a FNaF World-styled spin-off game in the future. However, with the release of Freddy Fazbear's Pizzeria Simulator on December 4, 2017, this was confirmed to be a joke.

On June 28, 2018, the seventh main installment to the series, Ultimate Custom Night, was released on Steam for free. It features over 50 characters from the franchise. In Cawthon's Upcoming Projects post on Steam, he noted that deals for console ports have been signed, as well as announcing virtual reality and augmented reality games.

==== Steel Wool Studios–made games ====
In early 2019, Cawthon announced he had joined with video game studio Steel Wool Studios, with whom he intended to develop additional Five Nights at Freddy's games, and that he would primarily be responsible for storylines, character design, and gameplay. On May 28, 2019, Cawthon released the teased virtual reality game Five Nights at Freddy's: Help Wanted for both PC and PlayStation VR. A downloadable content update, Curse of Dreadbear, was released on October 23, 2019.

In September 2019, a teaser and announcement trailers were posted to Illumix's YouTube channel regarding the augmented reality game. The title was revealed to be Five Nights at Freddy's: Special Delivery. It was released for free on November 25, 2019, on iOS and Android.

On August 8, 2019, during the first game's fifth anniversary, Cawthon posted an image on his website, teasing the tenth installment of the series. It shows a modernized shopping mall containing a laser tag arena, an arcade, a large cinema, and a Freddy Fazbear's Pizza restaurant; in the main square, '80s-style versions of Freddy Fazbear, Chica, and two animatronics can be seen playing for an excited crowd. On September 29, 2019, Cawthon's website was updated with a teaser featuring the character Glamrock Freddy and was followed by an updated teaser featuring the character Vanny from Five Nights at Freddy's: Help Wanted as a shadow. On March 24, 2020, another teaser featuring an alligator-like character was posted, later revealed to be called Montgomery Gator. On April 21, 2020, the characters' names were leaked from Funko's list of upcoming products, and the title was revealed as Five Nights at Freddy's: PizzaPlex. A few hours later, on April 22, 2020, Scott Cawthon confirmed the leaks via Reddit and revealed that the title was not official and that it was only for Funko. Cawthon announced that the game was scheduled to release in late 2020. On June 12, 2020, another teaser was released, featuring the game's antagonist, an unnamed female security guard. On August 7, 2020, a teaser of Vanny was released. One day later, Cawthon revealed the characters Glamrock Chica and Roxanne Wolf through Reddit.

On August 21, 2020, Cawthon announced his plan to help fund and publish Five Nights at Freddy's games developed by fans, bundled with previous installments in their respective series. He would not be involved in any of the creative elements but would help with marketing and publishing support, as well as appropriate licensing. The games that were announced to be included were One Night at Flumpty's series, the Five Nights at Candy's series, The Joy of Creation: Ignited Collection (consisting of the original The Joy of Creation, The Joy of Creation: Reborn, and The Joy of Creation: Story Mode), Popgoes Evergreen (including the prologue game Popgoes Arcade), and Five Nights at Freddy's Plus, a reimagining of the original game. Cawthon stated that these games would likely come to mobile and consoles, and may have merchandise created for them. The first game to be released under this initiative was a port of One Night at Flumpty's for Android and iOS on October 31 and November 18, 2020, respectively. The second game to be released was a port of its sequel, One Night at Flumpty's 2, on January 20, 2021, again for Android and iOS. The next game to be released was One Night at Flumpty's 3 on October 31, 2021, for PC and mobile devices, and for consoles at a later date.

On September 16, 2020, during a PlayStation 5 Showcase, it was revealed that Five Nights at Freddy's: Security Breach would come to PlayStation 5, featuring real-time ray tracing and free-roam gameplay. Its initial release was on PlayStation 5, PlayStation 4, and PC, with other platforms coming three months later. In December 2020, Cawthon posted that Five Nights at Freddy's: Security Breach was delayed to 2021, stating the game's scope was too great to be finished by the end of 2020.

=== 2021: Retirement from game development ===
On June 16, 2021, following a controversy where it was revealed that Cawthon had donated money to Republican Party politicians, Cawthon posted a message on his website announcing his retirement from public game development and expressing gratitude towards his followers for their ongoing support. He stated that he wished to retire in order to spend more time with his children. He intended to appoint a successor to ensure that the Five Nights at Freddy's franchise would continue, while he himself would continue to occupy a lesser role in its development. As of 2026, Cawthon has overarching creative control over the franchise and the exclusive rights over it.

On October 18, 2023, Cawthon released his first video game since his retirement, Freddy in Space 3: Chica in Space, which was released as a supposed tie-in game for the Five Nights at Freddy's film.

== Other activities ==
=== Novels ===
In May 2013, Cawthon released his first literary work, "The Tearing" under the pseudonym "Michael Parsins".

In December 2015, Cawthon released teasers for his first novel, Five Nights at Freddy's: The Untold Story, later renamed Five Nights at Freddy's: The Silver Eyes. The book was released on December 17, 2015, as an ebook for Amazon; a paperback edition is available. According to Cawthon, the book was released earlier than its planned release date due to a mistake on Amazon's part. On June 24, 2016, Cawthon announced that he had made a three-book deal with Scholastic Corporation and that the first book (The Silver Eyes) would be reprinted on paperback in October that year, with the second and third being released in 2017 and 2018.

On June 27, 2017, Cawthon's second novel, Five Nights at Freddy's: The Twisted Ones, was released. It was the sequel to The Silver Eyes, and its story follows the main character, Charlie, who is "drawn back into the world of her father's frightening creations" when she tried to get over the events of The Silver Eyes. On August 29, 2017, Cawthon released the first official guidebook of Five Nights at Freddy's, entitled The Freddy Files. It contains character profiles, easter eggs, advice for playing the games, and theories sprouted from the franchise.

On December 26, 2017, Cawthon released the second guidebook for Five Nights at Freddy's called Survival Logbook. Unlike previous book releases, Survival Logbook has no listed Amazon Kindle editions, implying that it has pages designed for physical writing as opposed to simply reading from a device. The book, disguised as a normal children's activity book, contains many things to do, including a word search, grid drawing, and fill-in-the-blank activities; however, all of these were found to hold secrets involving the lore.

On June 26, 2018, the third novel in the Five Nights at Freddy's book series, Five Nights at Freddy's: The Fourth Closet, was revealed on Amazon and was slated for release that same day. On December 26, 2019, the first book in the eleven-book series, Fazbear Frights #1: Into the Pit was released on Amazon in Kindle and paperback formats. The next ten books also had their release dates and titles announced over time.

=== Film adaptations ===
Warner Bros. Pictures announced in April 2015 that it had acquired the rights to adapt the series to film. Roy Lee, David Katzenberg, and Seth Grahame-Smith were set to produce. Grahame-Smith stated that they would collaborate with Cawthon "to make an insane, terrifying and weirdly adorable movie". In July 2015, Gil Kenan signed to direct the adaptation and co-write it with Tyler Burton Smith.

In January 2017, Cawthon stated that partially due to "problems within the movie industry as a whole", the film "was met with several delays and roadblocks" and it was "back at square one", but he promised "to be involved with the movie from day one this time, and that's something extremely important to me. I want this movie to be something that I'm excited for the fanbase to see."

In March 2017, Cawthon posted a picture to Twitter of himself at Blumhouse Productions, suggesting the film had a new production company. In May 2017, producer Jason Blum confirmed the news, saying he was excited and working closely with Cawthon on the adaptation. In June 2017, Gil Kenan said he was no longer directing the Five Nights at Freddy's film after Warner Bros. Pictures' turnaround. On February 13, 2018, Blumhouse Productions revealed on Twitter that Chris Columbus would be working on the film as a director, alongside producing it with Blum and Cawthon.

In August 2018, Cawthon posted a Steam forum, in which he states that the film will be based on the first game and that if second and third movies are made, they will be based on the second and third game, respectively. Later that same month, Blum tweeted that the film had a planned release window of 2020. In November 2018, Cawthon announced that the film's script had been scrapped and it would be further delayed.

Blum revealed in September 2021 that the film still had script issues and that Columbus was no longer attached to the project as director. In October 2022, Emma Tammi was announced to direct the film in addition to co-writing alongside Cawthon and Seth Cuddeback. The film released on October 27, 2023, to negative reviews from critics, but was a box office success, grossing over $296 million.

In 2024, it was revealed that a sequel was in the works. Like the previous film, Cawthon wrote the screenplay. Five Nights at Freddy's 2 was released on December 5, 2025, to negative reviews from critics.

== Public image ==
In November 2019, Cawthon announced that he would be creating a game specifically for a fundraising event for St. Jude Children's Research Hospital hosted by YouTuber MatPat, who would play the game with fellow YouTubers Dawko and Markiplier on a livestream. The game, Freddy in Space 2, was released on December 3 on Game Jolt, and included dollar amounts hidden throughout that dictated how much Cawthon would donate following the stream. He boasted that a total of $500,000 was available to find but warned that it was difficult and that he doubted they would be able to find it all, as his playtester had taken five hours to complete the game. Originally, the game had a two-hour slot to be featured in the livestream; however, Markiplier continued playing after the stream had ended and managed to find a final hidden US$100,000 that raised the total donation figure to US$451,200. Cawthon went on to donate the full US$500,000 to St. Jude's.

On March 9, 2024, Cawthon appeared in an episode of The Game Theorists entitled "MatPat's FINAL Theory!" which was MatPat's final episode appearance as host after he announced his retirement from YouTube on January 9. This was Cawthon's first public video appearance.

=== Politics ===
In June 2021, Cawthon became a trending topic on Twitter when his publicly available political donations were shared on the website. Except for one donation to then-Democratic representative Tulsi Gabbard and another donation to former Indiana House Speaker John R. Gregg, also a Democrat, all of Cawthon's donations were to Republican politicians, including Mitch McConnell and U.S. President Donald Trump. He posted on Reddit to confirm his support for the Republican Party, describing himself as pro-life. He claimed that he had been doxxed and had received threats of violence and home invasion after his donations were publicized. Reactions on social media were mixed, with some people reacting negatively. Days later, Cawthon announced his intention to step away from professional game development and appoint someone else to assume creative control of the franchise.

== Personal life ==
Cawthon resides in Salado, Texas. He has six children, including Braden Cawthon, who is a published author. In 2024, it became public knowledge that Cawthon and his wife had divorced.

== Works ==
=== Ludography ===
Non-Five Nights at Freddy's video games
Year	Title	Platform	Genre	Lost Media	Found by	Notes
1994	Untitled Pirate Game	PC	Unknown	Yes	—N/a	Scott's unreleased "test" game
1994	Doofas	PC	Multidirectional shooter	No	"Found" by Scott himself; publicly released by Dawko in September 2017	Scott's first full game; first shown at Dawko's charity livestream for the American Red Cross in September 2017 as a $5000 donation goal reward
2002	Shroomin	Unknown	Unknown	Maybe	—N/a	
2002	RPG Workshop Max / RPG Max	PC	RPG creation tool	Yes	—N/a	Used to be available at the 3D asset store Renderosity
2003	The Fifth Paradox	PC	RPG	No	The Daily Click user MSTViper in June 2020	—N/a
2003	RPG Workshop Max 2 / RPG Max 2	PC	RPG creation tool	Yes	—N/a	Sequel to RPG Workshop Max / RPG Max
2003	Lost Island	PC	Unknown	Yes	—N/a	—N/a
2003	Elemage	PC	RPG	No	The Daily Click user Circy/Chris Street, and Discord users CavernCroc and Mari in January 2026 (Note: greenfang95 (February 8, 2026). "Elemage and WAR Got Recovered and are Now Optimized! Available in Volume 1!". The ScottGames Archive. Game Jolt. Archived from the original on May 17, 2026.)	—N/a
2003	Mega Knight	PC	Action/Side-scroller	Yes	—N/a	—N/a
2003	Demon Knight	PC	Unknown	Yes	—N/a	Possibly a sequel to Mega Knight
2003	Dungeon	PC	Unknown	Partially found	—N/a	A few sprites from the game have been found
2003	Dinostria	PC	Action-adventure	Yes	—N/a	—N/a
2003	Phantom Core: The Moon Mission	PC	Multidirectional shooter	No	Reddit users The_MPP and Convert2Double in March 2018	—N/a
2003	Phantom Core 2 (Beta)	PC	Multidirectional shooter	Yes	—N/a	Beta version of a planned Phantom Core: The Moon Mission sequel
2003	War	PC	First-person shoot-'em-up	No	The Daily Click user Circy/Chris Street, and Discord users CavernCroc and Mari in January 2026	—N/a
2003	Gunball	PC	Fixed space shooter	Yes	—N/a	—N/a
2003	Stellar Gun	PC	Fixed space shooter	No	Reddit user MagiCraftCat in June 2017	—N/a
2003	Ships of Chaos	PC	Fixed space shooter	Yes	—N/a	—N/a
2003	Legacy of Flan	PC	RPG	No	The Daily Click user Spiderhead/Paul Bates in November 2016	First Legacy of Flan game
2003	Legacy of Flan 2: Online	PC	Online multiplayer RPG	No	The Daily Click user Spiderhead/Paul Bates in November 2016	Second Legacy of Flan game
2003	Legacy of Flan Online v2.0: Arena	PC	Online multiplayer RPG	No	The Daily Click user Joshtek in February 2020	Update to Legacy of Flan 2: Online
2003	Legacy of Flan 3: Storm of Hades	PC	Online multiplayer RPG	No	The Daily Click user Spiderhead/Paul Bates in November 2016	Third Legacy of Flan game
2004	Flanville	PC	Online multiplayer RPG	No	The Daily Click user Fifth in June 2017	Legacy of Flan spin-off; first Flanville game
2004	Junkyard Apocalypse	PC	Online multiplayer run-and-gun	No	Unknown	—N/a
2004	Moon Minions	PC	Online multiplayer RPG	No	The Daily Click user Joshtek in March 2020	—N/a
2005	Flanville 2	PC	Online multiplayer RPG	No	Unknown	Legacy of Flan spin-off; second Flanville game
2005	Mini-Metroid	PC	Metroidvania/Platformer	No	The Daily Click user Fifth in June 2017	Metroid fangame; early version of Metroid: Ripped Worlds
2005	Metroid: Ripped Worlds	PC	Metroidvania/Platformer	No	The Daily Click user Circy/Chris Street in August 2020 (Note: Convert2Double (August 11, 2020). "[STUPENDOUS NEWS] Metroid: Ripped Worlds (The Full Version) has been found!". Reddit. Archived from the original on June 17, 2023.)	Metroid fangame
2005	Legend of White Whale	PC	RPG	No	Unknown	First Mushsnail Tale game
2005	Chup's Quest	PC	Action RPG	No	Unknown	Second Mushsnail Tale game
2006	The Misadventures of Sigfried the Dark Elf on a Tuesday Night	PC	Metroidvania/Platformer	No	Unknown	—N/a
2006	Bogart	PC	Platformer	No	Unknown	—N/a
2006	Bogart 2: Return of Bogart	PC	Platformer	No	Unknown	Sequel to Bogart
2006	Light from Above	PC	Online multiplayer RPG	No	The Daily Click user Fifth in October 2018 (Note: Convert2Double (October 16, 2018). "Light from Above, an unmentioned 2006 MMORPG, has been recovered!". Reddit. Archived from the original on June 10, 2023.)	Beta version of unfinished game
2007	Weird Colony	PC	Online multiplayer RPG	Yes	—N/a	—N/a
2007	M.O.O.N.	PC	Metroidvania/Platformer	No	Unknown	—N/a
2007	Legacy of Flan 4: Flan Rising	PC	RPG	No	Unknown	Fourth Legacy of Flan game
2007	The Desolate Room	PC	RPG	No	Re-released by Scott himself on Game Jolt in October 2015	First The Desolate Series game
2008	Iffermoon	PC	Action RPG	No	Unknown	—N/a
2011	The Powermon Adventure!	PC	RPG	No	Unknown	Pokémon parody
2011	Doomsday Picnic	PC	Platformer	No	Unknown	—N/a
2011	Slumberfish!	PC; Android iOS	Puzzle	No	Unknown	—N/a
2011	Slumberfish!: Catching Z's	PC	Puzzle	No	Unknown	Sequel to Slumberfish!
2011	The Pilgrim's Progress: The Video Game	PC	Action RPG	No	Never lost	Based on the novel The Pilgrim's Progress by John Bunyan; still available for purchase in Hope Animation's website
2012	The Desolate Hope	PC	Adventure/RPG/platformer hybrid	No	Never lost	Second The Desolate Series game; only non-Five Nights at Freddy's game made by Scott Cawthon still available on Steam
2013	Aquatic Critters Slots	Android iOS	Mobile casino game	No	Unknown	—N/a
2013	Vegas Fantasy Jackpot	Android iOS	Mobile casino game	No	Unknown	—N/a
2013	Vegas Wild Slots	Android iOS	Mobile casino game	No	Unknown	—N/a
2013	Golden Galaxy	Android iOS	Shoot-'em-up	No	Unknown	The Desolate Series spin-off
2013	Mafia! Slot Machine	Android iOS	Mobile casino game	No	Unknown	—N/a
2013	Platinum Slots Collection	Android iOS	Mobile casino game	No	Unknown	—N/a
2013	Chipper and Sons Lumber Co.	PC; Android iOS	Adventure/business simulation game	No	Re-released by Scott himself on Game Jolt in October 2015	—N/a
2013	Bad Waiter Tip Calculator	Android iOS	Unknown	Yes	—N/a	—N/a
2014	Forever Quester	Android iOS	Idle RPG	No	Unknown	—N/a
2014	Jumbo Slots Collection	Android iOS	Mobile casino game	No	Discord user PopCultureCorn in April 2026 (Note: greenfang95 (April 24, 2026). "3 More (Slot) Games Have Been Recovered!". The ScottGames Archive. Game Jolt. Archived from the original on May 19, 2026.)	—N/a
2014	Pimp My Dungeon	Android iOS	Tower defense	No	Unknown	—N/a
2014	There is No Pause Button!	Android iOS	Platformer	No	Unknown	—N/a
2014	Fighter Mage Bard	Android iOS	RPG	No	Unknown	—N/a
2014	Use Holy Water!	Android iOS	Target shooter	No	Unknown	—N/a
2014	Rage Quit	Android iOS	Platformer	No	Unknown	—N/a
2014	20 Useless Apps	iOS	Minigame compilation	No	Unknown	—N/a
2014	Cropple	Android iOS	Puzzle	No	Unknown	—N/a
2014	Spooky Scan	Android iOS	"Ghost-detector" game	No	Discord user ultr4nima in November 2025 (Note: greenfang95 (November 12, 2025). "Version 1.5.0 - Two More Games Added to Volume 1!". The ScottGames Archive. Game Jolt. Archived from the original on May 19, 2026.)	—N/a
2014	Pogoduck	Android iOS	Endless runner	No	Unknown	—N/a
2014	Scott's Fantasy Slots	Android iOS	Mobile casino game	No	Discord user ultr4nima in November 2025	—N/a
2014	VIP Woodland Casino	PC; Android iOS	Mobile casino game	No	Unknown	—N/a
2014	Hawaiian Jackpots	Android iOS	Mobile casino game	No	Discord user PopCultureCorn in April 2026	—N/a
2014	8-Bit RPG Creator / Snap-A-Game: Classic RPG	PC; Android iOS	RPG creation tool	No	Unknown	The main app has been found, but the app had 2 DLC packs that are still lost due to being unavailable for purchase: Zombies Attack and Cuddly Creatures
2014	Bible Story Slots	Android iOS	Mobile casino game	Partially found	—N/a	The standalone app is still lost, but its slots were found inside Magnum Slots Collection.
2014	Magnum Slots Collection	Android iOS	Mobile casino game	No	Discord user PopCultureCorn in April 2026	Collection of slots from Scott's previous casino games
2014	Gemsa	Android iOS	Puzzle	No	Unknown	—N/a
2014	Fart Hotel	Android iOS	Guessing game	No	Unknown	—N/a
2014	Chubby Hurdles	Android iOS	Endless runner	No	Unknown	—N/a
2014	Shell Shatter	Android iOS	Puzzle	No	Unknown	—N/a
2014	Kitty in the Crowd	Android iOS	Hidden object game	No	Unknown	—N/a
2014	Dark Prisms	Android iOS	Puzzle	Yes	—N/a	—N/a
2014	Sit 'N' Survive	Android iOS	Tower defense	No	Unknown	—N/a

Cancelled games
Title	Notes
Flanville 3	Legacy of Flan spin-off; third Flanville game
Legacy of Flan 5: The Quest for Consumption	Fifth Legacy of Flan game
Legacy of Flan remake	Remake of the original Legacy of Flan
The Desolate Abandon	Third The Desolate Series game
Five Laps at Freddy's	Five Nights at Freddy's kart-racing spin-off

Five Nights at Freddy's video games
Year	Title	Director	Writer	Producer	Programmer	Voice Actor	Voice Role
2014	Five Nights at Freddy's	Yes	Yes	Yes	Yes	Yes	"Phone Guy"
2014	Five Nights at Freddy's 2	Yes	Yes	Yes	Yes	Yes	"Phone Guy"
2015	Five Nights at Freddy's 3	Yes	Yes	Yes	Yes	Yes	"Phone Dude" and "Phone Guy"
2015	Five Nights at Freddy's 4	Yes	Yes	Yes	Yes	Yes	"Phone Guy" (archive sound)
2016	FNaF World	Yes	Yes	Yes	Yes	No	—N/a
2016	Five Nights at Freddy's: Sister Location	Yes	Yes	Yes	Yes	No	—N/a
2017	Freddy Fazbear's Pizzeria Simulator	Yes	Yes	Yes	Yes	No	—N/a
2018	Ultimate Custom Night	Yes	Yes	Yes	Yes	Yes	"Phone Guy" (archive sound)
2019	Five Nights at Freddy's: Help Wanted	No	Yes	Yes	No	Yes	"Phone Guy" and "Phone Dude" (both archive sound)
2019	Five Nights at Freddy's AR: Special Delivery	No	Yes	Yes	No	No	—N/a
2019	Freddy in Space 2	Yes	Yes	Yes	Yes	No	—N/a
2021	Security Breach: Fury's Rage	Yes	Yes	Yes	Yes	Yes	Himself
2021	Five Nights at Freddy's: Security Breach	No	Yes	Yes	No	No	—N/a
2022	Popgoes Arcade	No	No	Yes	No	No	—N/a
2022	Youtooz Presents: Five Nights at Freddy's	No	Yes	Yes	No	No	—N/a
2023	Freddy in Space 3: Chica in Space	Yes	Yes	Yes	Yes	No	—N/a
2023	Five Nights at Freddy's: Help Wanted 2	No	Yes	Yes	No	No	—N/a
2024	MyPopgoes	No	No	Yes	No	No	—N/a
2024	Five Nights at Freddy's: Into the Pit	No	Yes	Yes	No	No	—N/a
2025	Five Nights at Freddy's: Secret of the Mimic	No	Yes	Yes	No	No	—N/a
TBA	The Joy of Creation	No	No	Yes	No	No	—N/a

=== Filmography ===
Films

Year	Title	Creator	Director	Writer	Producer	Animator	Notes
1997	Three Birds and a Snake	Yes	Yes	Yes	Yes	Yes	Lost animated short film
1999	Birdvillage Beak's Vacation	Yes	Yes	Yes	Yes	Yes	Part of the Birdvillage series; formerly lost media, found in a VHS compilation by Reddit user kyngwzrd in November 2020
1999	Birdvillage Beak's Adventure	Yes	Yes	Yes	Yes	Yes	Part of the Birdvillage series; formerly lost media, found in a VHS compilation by Reddit user kyngwzrd in November 2020
1999	Birdvillage Beak's Snowball Fight	Yes	Yes	Yes	Yes	Yes	Part of the Birdvillage series
2003	Birdvillage: The Movie	Yes	Yes	Yes	Yes	Yes	Part of the Birdvillage series; formerly lost media, found in a VHS compilation by YouTube user Phillebrave in March 2024
2003	Birdvillage: Second Nest	Yes	Yes	Yes	Yes	Yes	Lost animated film; part of the Birdvillage series
2003	A Mushsnail Tale	Yes	Yes	Yes	Yes	Yes	Mushsnail Tale series
2003	Return to Mushsnail: The Legend of the Snowmill	Yes	Yes	Yes	Yes	Yes	Mushsnail Tale series
2004	Noah's Ark: Story of the Biblical Flood	Yes	Yes	Yes	Yes	Yes	Based on the biblical narrative of Noah's Ark
2004	The Pilgrim's Progress	Yes	Yes	Yes	Yes	Yes	Based on the novel of same name by John Bunyan
2006	A Christmas Journey: About the Blessings God Gives	Yes	Yes	Yes	Yes	Yes	An original Christmas film
2006	Christmas Symbols	Yes	Yes	Yes	Yes	Yes	Animated short film included on the DVD release of A Christmas Journey: About the Blessings God Gives
2010	Bible Plays: David and Golliath	Yes	Yes	Yes	Yes	Yes	Bible Plays short film series
2010	Bible Plays: Noah's Ark	Yes	Yes	Yes	Yes	Yes	Bible Plays short film series
2023	Five Nights at Freddy's	Yes	No	Yes	Yes	No	Live-action films based on his video-game series Five Nights at Freddy's; co-produced with Blumhouse
2025	Five Nights at Freddy's 2	Yes	No	Yes	Yes	No	Live-action films based on his video-game series Five Nights at Freddy's; co-produced with Blumhouse

Animator only
Year	Title	Notes
2001–2009	Earth Science	Educational direct-to-video films for the company Rock 'N Learn
2001–2009	Human Body	Educational direct-to-video films for the company Rock 'N Learn
2001–2009	Life Science	Educational direct-to-video films for the company Rock 'N Learn
2001–2009	Physical Science	Educational direct-to-video films for the company Rock 'N Learn
2001–2009	Alphabet Circus	Educational direct-to-video films for the company Rock 'N Learn
2001–2009	Money & Making Change	Educational direct-to-video films for the company Rock 'N Learn
2001–2009	Division Rap	Educational direct-to-video films for the company Rock 'N Learn
2001–2009	Dance with the Animals	Educational direct-to-video films for the company Rock 'N Learn
2001–2009	Getting Ready for Kindergarten	Educational direct-to-video films for the company Rock 'N Learn
2001–2009	Writing Strategies (Proofreading Skills and Writing Skills)	Educational direct-to-video films for the company Rock 'N Learn
2001–2009	Reading Comprehension	Educational direct-to-video films for the company Rock 'N Learn
2001–2009	Math Word Problems	Educational direct-to-video films for the company Rock 'N Learn
2001–2009	What is Multiplication?	Educational direct-to-video short film for the company Rock 'N Learn, included as a bonus feature on a DVD called Multiplication Rap
2001–2009	Telling Time	Educational direct-to-video films for the company Rock 'N Learn
2001–2009	Nursery Rhymes	Educational direct-to-video films for the company Rock 'N Learn

Series

Year	Title	Creator	Director	Writer	Producer	Animator	Notes
2010	The Jesus's Kids Club	Yes	Yes	Yes	Yes	Yes	6 episodes
2021	Freddy & Friends: On Tour!	Yes	Yes	Yes	Yes	No	4 episodes; miniseries of teasers for the video-game Five Nights at Freddy's: Security Breach, co-directed with Jason Topolski
2024	The Game Theorists	No	No	No	No	No	1 episode: "MatPat’s FINAL Theory!" - Himself (cameo)
2025	MCM Archive	Yes	Yes	Yes	Yes	No	4 episodes; miniseries of teasers for the video-game Five Nights at Freddy's: Secret of the Mimic, co-directed with Jason Topolski

=== Bibliography ===
Novels

Year	Title	Co-authors
2013	The Tearing (Note: Partially lost e-book, self-published under the pseudonym Michael Parsins. "The Tearing". U.S. Copyright Office Public Records System. Number: TXU001851390. "Date: 2013-02-06")	—N/a
2015	Five Nights at Freddy's: The Silver Eyes	Kira Breed-Wrisley
2017	Five Nights at Freddy's: The Twisted Ones	Kira Breed-Wrisley
2018	Five Nights at Freddy's: The Fourth Closet	Kira Breed-Wrisley
2019	Fazbear Frights #1: Into the Pit	Elley Cooper
2020	Fazbear Frights #2: Fetch	Andrea Waggener; Carly Anne West
2020	Fazbear Frights #3: 1:35 A.M.	Elley Cooper; Andrea Waggener
2020	Fazbear Frights #4: Step Closer	Elley Cooper; Kelly Parra; Andrea Waggener
2020	Fazbear Frights #5: Bunny Call	Elley Cooper; Andrea Waggener
2020	Fazbear Frights #6: Blackbird	Kelly Parra; Andrea Waggener
2021	Fazbear Frights #7: The Cliffs	Elley Cooper; Andrea Waggener
2021	Fazbear Frights #8: Gumdrop Angel	Andrea Waggener
2021	Fazbear Frights #9: The Puppet Carver	Elley Cooper
2021	Fazbear Frights #10: Friendly Face	Andrea Waggener
2021	Fazbear Frights #11: Prankster	Elley Cooper; Andrea Waggener
2022	Fazbear Frights #12: Felix the Shark	Elley Cooper; Kelly Parra; Andrea Waggener
2022	Tales from the Pizzaplex #1: Lally's Game	Kelly Parra; Andrea Waggener
2022	Tales from the Pizzaplex #2: HAPPS	Elley Cooper; Andrea Waggener
2022	Tales from the Pizzaplex #3: Somniphobia	Kelly Parra; Andrea Waggener
2022	Tales from the Pizzaplex #4: Submechanophobia	Kelly Parra; Andrea Waggener
2023	Tales from the Pizzaplex #5: The Bobbiedots Conclusion	Andrea Waggener
2023	Tales from the Pizzaplex #6: Nexie	Kelly Parra; Andrea Waggener
2023	Tales from the Pizzaplex #7: Tiger Rock	Kelly Parra; Andrea Waggener
2023	Tales from the Pizzaplex #8: B7-2	Kelly Parra; Andrea Waggener
2023	Five Nights at Freddy's: The Official Movie Novel	Andrea Waggener
2024	Five Nights at Freddy's Interactive Novel #0: VIP	Eugene C. Myers
2024	Five Nights at Freddy's Interactive Novel #1: The Week Before	Eugene C. Myers
2024	Five Nights at Freddy's Interactive Novel #2: Return to the Pit	Adrienne Kress
2025	Five Nights at Freddy's Interactive Novel #3: Escape the Pizzaplex	Lyndsay Ely
2026	Five Nights at Freddy's 2: The Official Movie Novel	Andrea Waggener

Graphic novel adaptations
Year	Title	Based on	Co-authors	Illustrators
2019	Five Nights at Freddy's: The Silver Eyes - The Graphic Novel	Five Nights at Freddy's: The Silver Eyes novel	Kira Breed-Wrisley	Claudia Schröder
2021	Five Nights at Freddy's: The Twisted Ones - The Graphic Novel	Five Nights at Freddy's: The Twisted Ones novel	Kira Breed-Wrisley	Claudia Aguirre
2021	Five Nights at Freddy's: The Fourth Closet - The Graphic Novel	Five Nights at Freddy's: The Fourth Closet novel	Kira Breed-Wrisley	Diana Camero
2022	Fazbear Frights: Graphic Novel Collection Vol. 1	Fazbear Frights anthology novel series	Elley Cooper; Carly Anne West	Didi Esmeralda; Anthony Morris Jr. Andi Santagata
2023	Fazbear Frights: Graphic Novel Collection Vol. 2	Fazbear Frights anthology novel series	Andrea Waggener; Carly Anne West	Didi Esmeralda; Coryn MacPherson; Anthony Morris Jr.
2023	Fazbear Frights: Graphic Novel Collection Vol. 3	Fazbear Frights anthology novel series	Kelly Parra; Andrea Waggener	Diana Camero; Didi Esmeralda; Coryn MacPherson
2023	Fazbear Frights: Graphic Novel Collection Vol. 4	Fazbear Frights anthology novel series	Elley Cooper; Andrea Waggener	Diana Camero; Coryn MacPherson; Benjamin Sawyer
2024	Fazbear Frights: Graphic Novel Collection Vol. 5	Fazbear Frights anthology novel series	Elley Cooper; Andrea Waggener	Diana Camero; Coryn MacPherson; Benjamin Sawyer
2025	Tales from the Pizzaplex: Graphic Novel Collection Vol. 1	Tales from the Pizzaplex anthology novel series	Andrea Waggener	Diana Camero; Coryn MacPherson; Macky Pamintuan
2025	Tales from the Pizzaplex: Graphic Novel Collection Vol. 2	Tales from the Pizzaplex anthology novel series	Kelly Parra; Andrea Waggener	Mike Anderson; Coryn MacPherson; Anthony Morris Jr.
2025	Tales from the Pizzaplex: Graphic Novel Collection Vol. 3	Tales from the Pizzaplex anthology novel series	Kelly Parra; Andrea Waggener	Mike Anderson; Coryn MacPherson; Anthony Morris Jr.

Five Nights at Freddy's guide books

Year	Title	FNaF media covered
2017	Five Nights at Freddy's: The Freddy Files	The original 5 games (from FNaF 1 to Sister Location); The Silver Eyes and The Twisted Ones novels
2019	Five Nights at Freddy's: The Freddy Files (Updated Edition)	All media covered by The Freddy Files guide book; Pizzeria Simulator; Ultimate Custom Night; The Fourth Closet novel; Survival Logbook activity book
2021	Five Nights at Freddy's: The Ultimate Guide	All media covered by The Freddy Files (Updated Edition) guide book; Help Wanted VR game; Special Delivery AR game; Fazbear Frights novel series
2022	Five Nights at Freddy's: Security Breach Files	Exclusively Security Breach's base game
2024	Five Nights at Freddy's: Security Breach Files (Updated Edition)	Security Breach; Security Breach's Ruin DLC
2025	Five Nights at Freddy's: Ultimate Guide 2.0	All media covered by The Ultimate Guide guide book; All media covered by the Security Breach Files (Updated Edition) guide book; Help Wanted 2; Into The Pit; Secret of the Mimic; Tales from the Pizzaplex novel series; Interactive Novels book series

Other books

Year	Title	Notes
2017	Five Nights at Freddy's: Survival Logbook	Activity book
2018	Art with Edge, Five Nights at Freddy's	Coloring book
2021	The Official Five Nights at Freddy's Coloring Book	Coloring book Co-author with Claudia Schröder
2022	The Official Five Nights at Freddy's How to Draw	Drawing book Co-author with Claudia Schröder
2023	Five Nights at Freddy's Official Character Encyclopedia	Encyclopedia of Five Nights at Freddy's characters
2023	The Official Five Nights at Freddy's Cookbook	Cooking book Co-author with Rob Morris
2024	The Official Five Nights at Freddy's Glow-in-the-Dark Coloring Book	Coloring book Co-author with Claudia Schröder
2025	The Official Five Nights at Freddy's Stickerpedia	Sticker book
2025	Five Nights at Freddy's: Ticket to Fun	Ephemera kit
2026	Five Nights at Freddy's Secret Artifacts	Cancelled novelty book
2026	Five Nights at Freddy's: The Art and Making of the Movies	Behind-the-scenes book on the two Five Nights at Freddy's movies Co-author with Cala Spinner
2026	Five Nights at Freddy's Character Encyclopedia: Updated and Expanded Edition	Encyclopedia of Five Nights at Freddy's characters
