= Five Nights at Freddy's: Sister Location =

2016 video game

- Steam storefront header
- Developer: Scott Cawthon
- Publishers: Scott Cawthon; Clickteam (mobile and consoles)
- Composer: Leon Riskin
- Series: Five Nights at Freddy's
- Engine: Clickteam Fusion 2.5
- Platforms: Windows; Android; iOS; Nintendo Switch; Xbox One; PlayStation 4
- Release: October 7, 2016: Windows; WW: October 7, 2016 Android; WW: December 22, 2016 iOS; WW: January 3, 2017 Switch; NA: June 18, 2020; EU: July 10, 2020 Xbox One; WW: July 10, 2020 PlayStation 4; EU: July 21, 2020; NA: July 22, 2020
- Genres: Survival horror, point-and-click
- Mode: Single-player

Five Nights at Freddy's: Sister Location is a 2016 point-and-click survival horror game developed and published by Scott Cawthon. It is the fifth main installment in the Five Nights at Freddy's series. Set at a sister location of Freddy Fazbear's Pizzeria called Circus Baby's Entertainment and Rental, players control a new employee who must perform maintenance work while defending themselves from a set of murderous animatronics. The gameplay in Sister Location differs significantly from the previous Five Nights at Freddy's games in that it grants players mobility between rooms where tasks are completed.

Cawthon teased the game in April 2016 with the tagline "there was never just one". Following a trailer released in May, it was released on Steam on October 7, 2016, on December 22 of the same year on Android, and on January 3 of the following year on iOS. It received mixed reviews, with praise for its voice performances and criticism for some aspects of its gameplay. A sequel, Freddy Fazbear's Pizzeria Simulator, was released on December 4, 2017. Ports for Nintendo Switch, Xbox One, and PlayStation 4 were released in 2020.

== Gameplay ==
A screenshot showcasing the Primary Control Module

Five Nights at Freddy's: Sister Location is a survival horror video game. The player controls Mike, a late-night technician for the animatronic rental company Circus Baby's Entertainment and Rental. The player character must complete five shifts, called "nights", without being caught by the animatronics that become mobile and homicidal at night.

Though it continues the series's point-and-click format, Sister Location introduces a more dynamic gameplay environment. Players use crawlspaces to move between the facility's rooms—Primary Control Module, Funtime Auditorium, Circus Control, and Ballora Gallery—to complete tasks. Each night concludes when the assigned tasks are completed rather than surviving a set timeframe against the animatronics. In addition to a company-issued AI voice named HandUnit, a variety of tools are available to the player to navigate the rooms and subdue the animatronics. For example, players use an elevated control pad on night one to light a room and shock the animatronics, and on night three, a flash beacon is used to navigate Funtime Auditorium and avoid its animatronic, Funtime Foxy.

As with all Five Nights at Freddy's games, failing to defend oneself from the animatronics results in a jumpscare, causing a game over. Unlike other games in the series, the animatronics do not actively pursue the player; instead, a jumpscare occurs if the assigned tasks are not completed correctly. If the player dies, there is a chance for them to enter an Atari-style platformer minigame, reminiscent to the post-death minigames in Five Nights at Freddy's 2, where the player acts as Circus Baby delivering cupcakes to children. Completing this minigame in a specific manner unlocks a secret level on the fifth night that reintroduces the immobile survival aspect of the original Five Nights at Freddy's. Completing all five nights unlocks additional features, including a "Custom Night" mode, where the player selects from various modes and difficulty settings and tries to survive the night against a new set of animatronics.

== Plot ==
Mike is hired by Circus Baby's Entertainment and Rental, an underground facility storing animatronics from the closed Circus Baby's Pizza World. The facility's AI, HandUnit, greets Mike each night and assigns him maintenance tasks. On the first night, everything runs smoothly: using elevated control pads, Mike checks on and, if necessary, administers electric shocks to the three animatronics—Ballora, Funtime Foxy, and Circus Baby—to ensure they remain active, before leaving. On the second night, the power goes out, the animatronics come to life, and Circus Baby warns Mike of the danger posed by the other animatronics. She instructs him across Ballora Gallery and assists him in resetting the circuit breakers in the breaker room, where Funtime Freddy resides. On the third night, after performing maintenance work on Funtime Freddy, Mike is attacked by Funtime Foxy. Circus Baby places him in a "springlock suit", an animatronic that can also be worn as a suit by retracting its mechanics into its lining, for his protection. On the fourth night, Mike must escape the suit while repelling tiny ballerina animatronics called Minireenas.

On the fifth night, Mike discovers two hanged technicians in the location where the animatronics should be, preventing HandUnit from detecting their absence. Circus Baby directs Mike to dismantle her empty shell in the Scooping Room, where the animatronics' endoskeletons are extracted by a machine called the Scooper, explaining that this is necessary to "save what is good so the rest can be destroyed". She warns him that he is being pursued by the animatronic Ballora, who intends to kill him. Between nights, Mike watches an animated sitcom at home.

=== Endings ===
The game has two endings. If Mike follows Circus Baby's instructions, he finds all animatronics have been gutted by the Scooper. Circus Baby's voice is revealed to be Ennard, an amalgam of the animatronics, who uses the Scooper to eviscerate Mike and disguise itself in his skin. The other ending is unlocked if the player defies Circus Baby's instructions by entering a private room, where they must fend off Ennard, angered by the player's defiance, until 6:00 a.m. Afterwards, Mike returns home to find that Ennard has followed him.

If the player completes the post-death minigame in a certain manner, Circus Baby extends a claw from her stomach and pulls in and kills a girl, presumed to be Elizabeth Afton, whose soul possesses the animatronic. Two sets of cutscenes may play if the player completes different modes of the Custom Night. If the player survives the hardest difficulty, Ennard abandons Mike's discolored and decomposed body and leaves him near death. Meanwhile, if the player completes "Golden Freddy" mode, the cutscenes show the ruins of a burnt-down Fazbear's Fright, where Mike speaks to his father, William Afton, the murderer mentioned in previous games. Disfigured and "living in shadows", Mike recounts that William manipulated him into freeing "her", prompting the animatronics to attack him, mistaking him for his father. With no other options, Mike resolves to find his father.

== Release and reception ==
Developer Scott Cawthon in 2025

Developer Scott Cawthon had previously stated that Five Nights at Freddy's 4 (2015) would be the final game in the series. However, he announced Five Nights at Freddy's: Sister Location on his website in April 2016 with the tagline, "There was never just one". A trailer was uploaded online on May 21. On October 7, Five Nights at Freddy's: Sister Location was released on Steam. Due to user complaints about the difficulty of night four, a patch was released to alleviate its difficulty. Downloadable content was later added for a non-canon Custom Night. Ports for Android and iOS were released by Clickteam on December 22, 2016, and January 3, 2017, respectively. Nintendo Switch, Xbox One, and PlayStation 4 ports were released on June 18, 2020; July 10, 2020; and July 21, 2020; respectively.

Five Nights at Freddy's: Sister Location received "mixed or average" reviews according to review aggregator site Metacritic. Aggregate site OpenCritic calculated that only 20% of critics recommended the game. Some have said that the game marked a significant advancement in the series' production quality, with Patricia Hernandez of Kotaku calling it Cawthon's "most ambitious game yet".

Reception

Aggregate scores
Aggregator	Score
Metacritic	62/100
OpenCritic	20% recommend

Review scores
Publication	Score
Destructoid	PC: 6/10
Gamezebo	MOB: 3/5
GameCrate	PC: 7.50/10

The gameplay of Sister Location garnered mixed reviews. Kotaku highlighted that the game features a voice that directs players through gameplay rather than leaving players to decipher mechanics themselves like in previous installments, and The A.V. Club and Destructoid praised the increased mobility and individual objectives, with the latter describing the different tasks as leading to "some fantastic moments and genuinely spooky scenarios." However, reviewers criticized the game's difficulty. Some found it to be too easy, while others argued that it is overly challenging. GameCrate's Angelo M. D'Arengio wrote that every night "ends up being its own tutorial and level one before being quickly discarded", arguing that the challenge is diminished after some trial-and-error. Conversely, Nic Rowen of Destructoid argued that while "Sister Location keeps things moving and delivers fresh thrills throughout the entire work week", its pacing in terms of difficulty is what obstructs other aspects of the game from excelling. Specifically, they pointed out that night four is a "massive roadblock", seemingly intended to pad out the game's length rather than enhance the experience.

Beyond the gameplay, critics have praised the atmosphere. Many have particularly highlighted the quality of the voice acting. GameCrate felt that the addition of voices to fit the animatronics enhanced the scare factor, stating that the animatronics "don't seem like mindless death machines anymore. They are intelligent. They know who you are, and they can manipulate you." William Hughes of The A.V. Club agreed, emphasizing Heather Masters's portrayal of Circus Baby. However, opinions on the game's use of humor were more divided. While GameCrate, The A.V. Club, and Kotaku found the humor to be a sound addition to the game—with the first arguing that it helped calm the player for a more intense subsequent jumpscare—Destructoid felt that most of the attempts at humor detracted from the atmosphere, suspecting they were included in service of merchandising.
