= John R. Lowery =

John R. Lowery (born February 9, 1967) is an American artist who specializes in landscapes and wildlife artwork. John launched his artistic career as an illustrator for one of the National Aeronautics and Space Administration’s (NASA) contractor companies, depicting missions in works that were published at both the national and international level. Today he displays and sells his work out of Humble Donkey Studio, the Round Top, Texas, art gallery he co-owns with wife Laurie Lowery. His mountain wildlife paintings are on display exclusively at Kemo Sabe’s Aspen and Vail, Colorado, sites, and will also have a home at the upcoming Jackson Hole, Wyoming, location.

== Early life ==
Born in Providence, Rhode Island, to Fred and Astrid Lowery, John and his family relocated to Houston, Texas, when he was still a young boy. A budding artist whose mother fully encouraged his talents, John honed in his artistic abilities with coursework at Houston’s Glassell School of Art (the teaching institute for the Museum of Fine Arts, Houston) and similar programs. At age 8, when his grandfather, another Fred Lowery, suggested he focus his skills on advertising, John began mapping out ways to transform his creative talents into paid work. He earned his degree in advertising from The Art Institute of Houston and found paid work in the advertising realm. Even so, he maintained dreams of becoming a fine artist — painting what he wanted to paint, how he wanted to paint it.

== Career ==
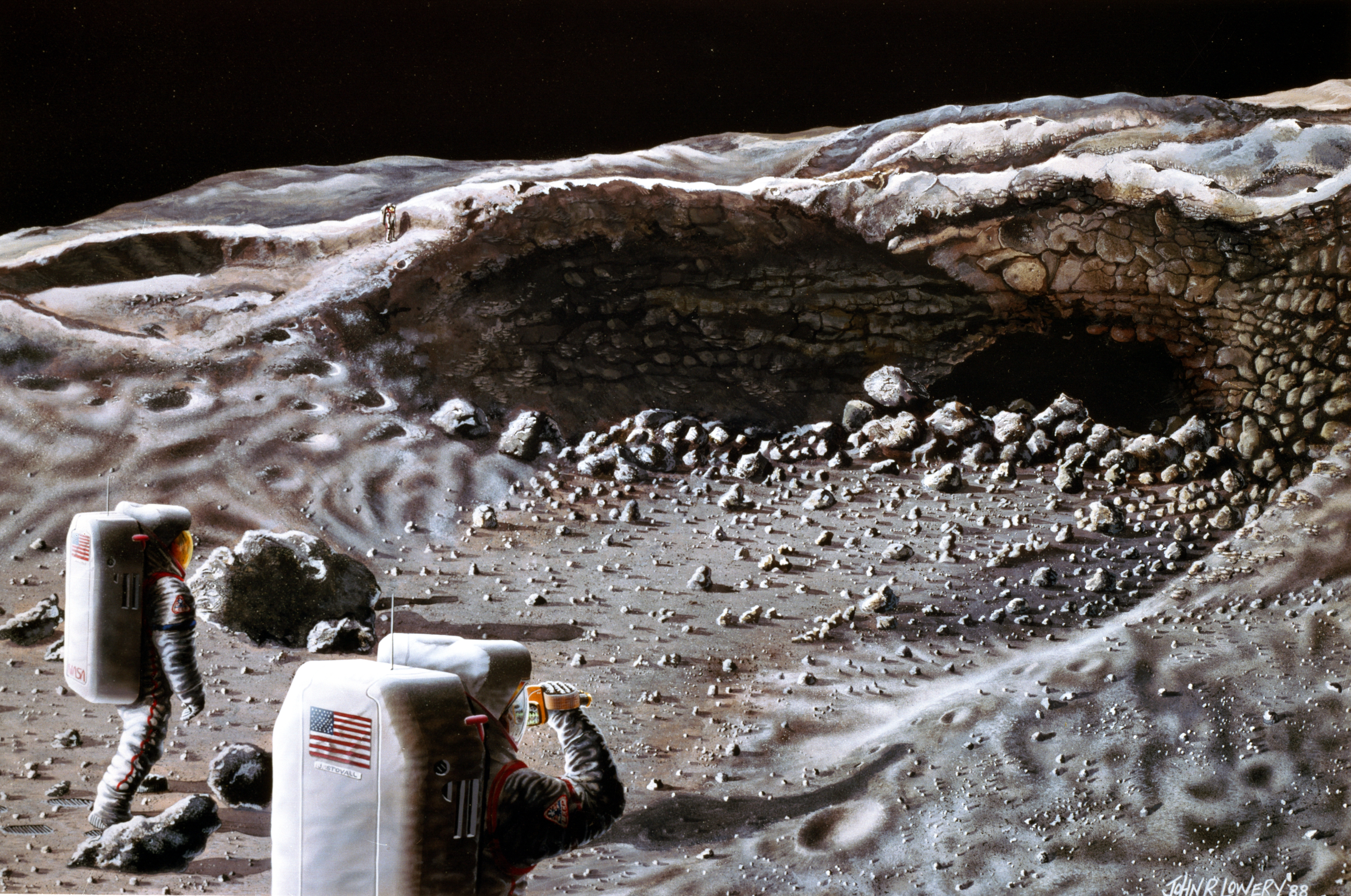
John Lowery's artistic career began with illustration work for a NASA contractor.

John Lowery’s career began immediately after high school, thanks in large part to connections forged by one of his teachers. Following graduation in 1985, John took on illustration work for a contractor with the National Aeronautics and Space Administration (NASA). In that role, John’s acrylic paintings of aeronautical equipment and historic space scenes graced, among other things, NASA’s walls, mission-specific publications and Friendswood, Texas-area phone books. He later moved on to an art director role with Space Industries, Inc. In 1990 he took his creative aspirations in a different direction with the founding of Design At Work, a full-service marketing, branding and advertising firm in Houston, Texas. Although he maintains his role as Design At Work CEO, he stepped away from day-to-day operations in 2016 to found Humble Donkey Studio, the art gallery and retail shop where he displays the majority of his original artwork.

== Humble Donkey Studio ==
Following a move to nearby Burton, Texas, John Lowery opened his art gallery, Humble Donkey Studio, in 2016 on Round Top’s historic Henkel Square. Although originally housed in a Round Top home built in the mid-1800s, the growing gallery relocated to a bigger building — a large red barn on the same square — the following year. Later renovation work added a full gallery wing to the historic structure. Today the shop’s walls are filled with John Lowery originals and giclee reproductions, while also sharing space with household goods, merchandise and antiques handpicked by Laurie Lowery.

Humble Donkey Studio diverges from the typical art gallery setting, offering free beer and fostering conversation. The shop’s habit of ringing a triangle bell when someone purchases an artwork, proclaiming “a donkey got its wings,” is a tradition John picked up from Harley-Davidson dealerships.
