= Loai Naseem =

Saudi fashion designer and business executive

- لؤي نسيم
- Born: 1969 (age 56–57); Jeddah, Saudi Arabia
- Education: The Art Institute of Houston
- Occupations: Fashion designer and business executive
- Known for: Chief Executive Officer at Lomar

Loai Muhammad Naseem (Arabic: لؤي نسيم; born 1969) is a Saudi fashion designer, graphic designer and business executive. He is best known for establishing Tafaseel International Trading Limited company (Lomar).

Lomar became a pioneer in the traditional Saudi men's apparel market, winning a loyal fan base. The company was named on the Saudi Fast Growth Startup 100 List twice.

Forbes ranked Naseem #2 on the list of Leaders Inspiring a Kingdom Saudi Arabia's Entrepreneurial Elite in 2014. Endeavor ranked Nassem #1 on the List of Leaders Inspiring a Kingdom Saudi Arabia's Entrepreneurial Elite in 2012.

== Early life and education ==
Born on January 10, 1969, in Jeddah, Saudi Arabia, Naseem graduated high school there. Unhappy with his business studies, he quit school after three years and began launching businesses with his father. In 1994 Loai travelled to the US to study graphic design at the Art Institute of Houston. He went on to work for advertising firms, and won several international awards for his designs.

== Career ==
Naseem returned to Jeddah in 1997 where he accepted a position as art director at the Leo Burnett Advertising Agency before becoming one of three co founding partners of "3points Advertising Agency" in 1998. Tired of wearing the same plain Saudi thobe to work each day, he began to design his own thobes with the help of his wife and a tailor. By 2004, while still a partner at 3points, Naseem was designing and selling thobes out of his home for more than 100 customers. Annual sales that year reached SR75,000 ($19,900). By the time he co-founded Lomar the following year, sales had climbed to SR1.5 million ($399,000).

== See also ==
- Thobe
