= Art Institute of Houston =

For-profit art school as part of The Art Institutes

Coordinates: 29.74842°N 95.47086°W

The Art Institute of Houston
- Type: Private for-profit art school
- Active: 1965–2023
- President: Harvey M. Giblin
- Location: Houston, Texas, United States
- Website: www.artinstitutes.edu/houston

The Art Institute of Houston was a private for-profit art school in Houston, Texas. It is owned by Education Principle Foundation. Founded in 1965 as the Houston School of Commercial Art, the school joined The Art Institutes system of schools in 1978 and moved to its final facility in 1990. All Art Institute schools closed on September 30, 2023.

The Art Institute of Houston was one of two locations of The Art Institutes system in Texas and was accredited by the Commission on Colleges of the Southern Association of Colleges and Schools (SACS).

== History ==
Alumni and professors of The Art Institute of Houston have been interviewed and featured in stories by major media outlets such as MSNBC and the Houston Chronicle as well as local media outlets such as the Houston Business Journal.

In 1999, 145 students brought suit against the Art Institute of Houston and its former parent company Education Management Corporation Inc alleging they were defrauded by the school. The students alleged that while seeking to gain a quality education, they were lured into enrollment at the Art Institute of Houston and encouraged to matriculate, often under an albatross of hefty student loans. They charged the school knowingly misled students into believing they would receive a valuable post-secondary education as well as skills which would lead to subsequent employment. The lawsuit was settled by a confidential agreement in 2000. In 2014-2015 the school was sued by the federal government for fraudulent loan practices. Accreditation was set to probationary status by SACS (Southern Association of Colleges and Schools). During which time, Goldman owned EDMC (Education Management Corporation) was being audited by federal regulators and found the mounting student debt along with other financial discrepancies. The institution replaced those stripped federal loans with an internal repayment program that withheld transcripts and diplomas from students until the balance was paid in full. Amidst 15 school closures across the nation, and liquidation of those assets, KKR restructured the campuses and many long-time instructors were fired or quit. With additional closures campuses were ordering a “teach-out” (including The Art Institute of Houston - North), EDMC sold to DCEH (Dream Center Education Holdings). By 2019 another class action suit —-Sweet v. Devos was filed. To date, under the Biden administration, the suit (now Sweet v. Cardona) has been preliminarily approved. The hearing for final approval for loan discharge of defrauded Class students is set for November 2022. Post class is set to be reviewed by the Department of Education under the Borrower Defense rule.

== Faculty ==
According to the College Navigator, Ai-Houston campus had seven full-time instructors and 28 part-time instructors.

== Student outcomes ==
According to the College Scorecard, AI-Houston had a 27 percent 8-year graduation rate. Median salary after attending ranges from $23,391 (BA in Fine Arts) to $46,769 (BS in Drafting Engineering). Median student loan debt ranged from $22,475 (AA in Applied Arts) to $44,269 (BA in Film and Photography). Two years after repayment, 10 percent were making progress in paying off their student loans.

== Notable alumni ==
- Blackberri, drag queen
- Dawn Burrell, chef and long jumper
- Scott Cawthon, video game developer and creator of Five Nights at Freddy's
- Tiffany Derry, celebrity chef and restauranteur
- Jaime Fletcher, filmmaker
- Sarah Grueneberg, chef
- John R. Lowery, artist
- Loai Naseem, fashion designer and graphic artist
