= Spiaggia =

Italian restaurant in Chicago

- Interactive map of Spiaggia

Restaurant information
- Location: 980 North Michigan Avenue, Chicago, Illinois, 60611, United States
- Coordinates: 41°54′2″N 87°37′29″W

Spiaggia was an Italian restaurant in Chicago on Michigan Avenue at Oak Street. After 37 years on the "Magnificent Mile," Spiaggia closed permanently, having never reopened following its COVID-19 closure in March 2020.

It was nominated for the James Beard Award for Outstanding Restaurant in 2007 and 2010.

Tony Mantuano was the chef for 35 years; he won the James Beard Award for Best Chefs in America in 2005.

The Michelin Guide called it "one of Chicago’s most beloved Italian restaurants" and the restaurant earned and retained a Michelin star for 12 consecutive years. The Chicago Tribune considered Spiaggia the best Italian restaurant in Chicago.

President-elect Obama and his wife dined at Spiaggia following his election victory in 2008.

== See also ==
- Tony Maws
- Missy Robbins
- Sarah Grueneberg
- List of Italian restaurants
- List of Michelin-starred restaurants in Chicago
