= Five Nights at Freddy's 4 =

2015 video game

- Steam storefront header
- Developer: Scott Cawthon
- Series: Five Nights at Freddy's
- Engine: Clickteam Fusion 2.5
- Platforms: Windows; Android; iOS; Nintendo Switch; PlayStation 4; Xbox One
- Release: July 23, 2015: Windows; July 23, 2015; Android; July 25, 2015; iOS; August 3, 2015; Switch, PlayStation 4, Xbox One; November 29, 2019
- Genres: Survival horror, point-and-click
- Mode: Single-player

Five Nights at Freddy's 4 (FNaF 4) is a 2015 point-and-click survival horror game developed by Scott Cawthon. The game is set in a child's bedroom, where the player must avoid attacks from nightmarish animatronics stalking them. In contrast to previous games in the Five Nights at Freddy's series, there is no series of security cameras to monitor animatronic progression, and instead the player must rely on audio cues to find them and use their flashlight to fend them off. In between nights, the player can play Atari-styled minigames which tell the story of a young boy who is consistently tormented by his older brother.

Five Nights at Freddy's 4 was first announced in April 2015, advertised as "The Final Chapter". Though initially planned to release on October 31, 2015, the game was released on July 23 on Windows. Versions for Android and iOS devices were released in the following days. Five Nights at Freddy's 4 received mixed reviews from critics, with some praising its unsettling atmosphere, while the game's mechanics and sound design received mixed reactions. A sequel, Five Nights at Freddy's: Sister Location, released on October 7, 2016. Versions for the Nintendo Switch, PlayStation 4, and Xbox One were released on November 29, 2019, alongside the first three games in the series.

== Gameplay ==
The player shines their flashlight down the left hallway in order to see if there are any animatronics that need to be closed off.

Five Nights at Freddy's 4 is a point-and-click survival horror game. Like previous games in the series, the player is tasked with surviving from midnight to 6:00 a.m. against homicidal animatronics. Unlike previous installments where the protagonists were security guards, the player controls a young child in his bedroom fending off nightmarish hallucinations of animatronic threats.

Unlike previous games in the series, the player does not have access to a network of security cameras, and must take advantage of audio cues in order to track the movement of the animatronics. The player is able to run around the bedroom, going between the closet, bed, and two doors. The player's only means of delaying animatronic advancement is a flashlight, which can be flashed in either the doors or the bed to scare them away. The player can also temporarily hold one of the doors shut at a time. If an animatronic enters the room or if the player encounters one directly, the player will be jumpscared and killed. On the fifth night, the enemies are replaced by a single animatronic known as Nightmare Fredbear, which is immune to being flashed with the flashlight, instead becoming more aggressive.

In-between nights, the player can attempt a minigame similar to red light, green light against a character named Plushtrap. If the player is successful, two hours are removed from the next night. Additionally, Atari-styled minigames are also playable, which provide insight on the lore of the series and is the source of the game's plot. These minigames are absent from mobile versions of the game.

== Plot ==
Playable minigames in between nights tell the story of a young boy in 1983, presumed to be the player character. In the first minigame, he is locked in a bedroom with plush toys that he considers to be his "friends". Throughout the minigame, a plush based on the animatronic Fredbear talks to him, strengthening his fear of the animatronics from a family restaurant near his home. Throughout the subsequent minigames, the boy is terrorized by his older brother, being deliberately scared, bullied, abandoned at the restaurant, and unwillingly locked in its parts and services room.

In the sixth minigame, the boy is tormented once more by his older brother and several other bullies that take advantage of his fear, eventually leading them to put the boy head-first into Fredbear's mouth, labeling it as a "kiss". Fredbear bites down on the boy, crushing him to death as the bullies watch in horror. On the seventh minigame, the boy is shown in a dark area surrounded by his toys and is told by an unknown voice that they will "put [him] back together". The toys slowly fade out, and soon the boy weeps and fades as well, while the faint sound of a heartrate monitor plays.

If the player beats the game on the unlockable "Nightmare" mode, a metal box is shown to the player which cannot be opened. If the player tries opening it, text appears above the box, saying: "perhaps some things are best left forgotten, for now." The contents of the box, or its meaning, is never explained.

== Development and release ==
Developer Scott Cawthon in 2025

Following the release of Five Nights at Freddy's 3, which was originally intended to be the final game in a trilogy, developer Scott Cawthon felt dissatisfied with its reception. He specifically noticed that players felt underwhelmed by the animatronic character Springtrap's jumpscare, and Five Nights at Freddy's 4's development was driven by his desire to create a more frightening and refined game with heightened jumpscares. Before beginning work on the game, he planned that it would have a unique setting. The process of creating the 3D models for the in-game animatronics took much longer than with previous entries in the series, due to the intricate details of their designs.

Five Nights at Freddy's 4 was announced on April 27, 2015, through a teaser image that was uploaded onto Scott Cawthon's website. It was advertised as "The Final Chapter", and had a release date slated for Halloween of that year. A trailer for the game was released in July, and the release date was pushed forward to August 8, which marked one year since the release date of the first game. On July 23, Cawthon announced that the game was already finished and released it early on Steam, later citing that he saw no reason to delay its distribution to the series' fanbase. Versions for Android and iOS were later released on July 25 and August 4, respectively.

An update for the game was released on Halloween of that year, adding additional content for those who had completed the game such as a cheat menu. On November 29, 2019, the game released for Nintendo Switch, PlayStation 4, and Xbox One alongside the first, second, and third games in the series. Despite Five Nights at Freddy's 4 being advertised as the final entry in the series, a fifth game, Five Nights at Freddy's: Sister Location, was released on October 7, 2016.

== Reception ==
Reception

Aggregate score
Aggregator	Score
Metacritic	PC: 51/100

Review scores
Publication	Score
Destructoid	PC: 4/10
Gamezebo	MOB: 4/5
Nintendo Life	NS: 7/10
PC Gamer (US)	PC: 70/100
PCGamesN	PC: 5/10
Pocket Gamer	5/10
TouchArcade	iOS: 3/5
The Escapist	PC: 4/5

Five Nights at Freddy's 4 received "mixed or average" reviews according to review aggregator website Metacritic, assigning the Windows version a score of 51 out of 100, based on six critic reviews.

The gameplay of Five Nights at Freddy's 4 received a mixed response. Some reviewers felt that the franchise and its gameplay were becoming stale, such as Nic Rowen of Destructoid and Omri Petitte of PC Gamer. The former described the game as a "bone dry" repeat of Five Nights at Freddy's, recommending people not play the game, and the latter wrote that the gameplay had little variety or strategy, and that it was too much of a chore to interest him. Contrarily, Angelo M. D'Argenio of The Escapist praised the reworked game mechanics and story, describing it as "perfect" for fans of the series, though criticized the glitches present within the game. The removal of the story based minigames from mobile version of the game was criticized by Shaun Musgrave of TouchArcade, who wrote that the removal of the story was detrimental to a game advertised as the final chapter.

Response towards the atmosphere and sound design of Five Nights at Freddy's 4 was positive, though some aspects were criticized. The game was described as being the most frightening in the series by Mitch Vogel of Nintendo Life, though he also described the game's jumpscares as being jarring, and that it made the horror elements feel "unearned". Nadia Oxford of Gamezebo praised the game's sound design, though criticized its gameplay for being too reliant on sound, theorizing that those in loud spaces would've had difficulty playing the game. Matt Purslow of PCGamesN praised the game's atmosphere design, but commented that the reliance on audio cues made him feel a lack of control, and that it was difficult to tell which sounds indicated the animatronics were approaching, and which were just for atmosphere.
