= Missy Robbins =

American chef

- Born: 1971 (age 53–54); Washington, D.C.
- Education: Peter Kump’s New York School of Cooking
- Culinary career
- Cooking style: Italian cuisine
- Rating(s): Michelin stars
- Current restaurant(s): Lilia; Misi
- Television show(s): Top Chef Masters
- Award(s) won: Food & Wine Best New Chef 2010

Missy Robbins (born 1971) is an American chef who has held a Michelin star at two restaurants, and a contestant on season four of Top Chef Masters. Robbins specializes in Italian cuisine and owns two Italian restaurants in Williamsburg, Brooklyn, Lilia and Misi, which opened in 2016 and 2018 respectively.

== Biography ==
Robbins graduated Georgetown University in 1993, majoring in art history with a minor in psychology. Whilst in her final semester at University she got a job at restaurant 1789 after being inspired by a friend who got a job at another restaurant. After initially working Friday and Saturday nights whilst at University, she went on to work there for a year before moving to New York to attend culinary school at Peter Kump's New York School of Cooking.

After she left culinary school, Robbins began to work at the Arcadia restaurant before joining Wayne Nish at his restaurant March. She moved to The Lobster Club and Arcadia, in NYC and working with Anne Rosenzweig before traveling in Northern Italy which became an influence on her cooking style. She returned to the United States to work at the Soho Grand Hotel, and moved to Chicago to work with Tony Mantuano as executive chef at Spiaggia. Whilst there, the restaurant was nominated twice for a James Beard Foundation Award and she frequently cooked for Barack and Michelle Obama.

She became executive chef at A Voce, changing the menu completely with the exception of two dishes, and would oversee the opening of a second location. The original location won a Michelin star in 2009, while the second location won a star in 2010. Both restaurants retain those awards through to the 2012 Michelin Guide. As of this edition of the Michelin Guide, she is one of only ten female chefs in the United States to hold a Michelin star.

In 2010, she was named Best New Chef by Food & Wine magazine. She was a contestant in series four of Top Chef Masters. She withdrew from the competition during the first episode, having cut her finger so badly that she required a skin graft on it.

In January 2016, Robbins opened Lilia, situated in a whitewashed building at the intersection of Union Avenue and North 10th Street in North Williamsburg, Brooklyn. It is an Italian pasta restaurant, though Robbins never originally set out to specialize in it, commenting, "I just always had an affinity for the ingredients … the cheeses and olive oils … and then as I started getting older and traveling, there’s something about Italy that just resonated with me". The restaurant earned Three Stars from The New York Times, and a James Beard Award nomination., In August 2018 Robbins opened her second Italian restaurant in Williamsburg, Brooklyn, Misi on the site of the former Domino Sugar Refinery. Its menu includes 10 varied pastas and 10 vegetable dishes, some with proteins. Half the menu is devoted to primi, featuring pasta shapes, including linguine, spaghetti, pappardelle, malloreddus, occhi, and strangozz. In 2018 Robbins was recognized as Best Chef New York City by the James Beard Foundation, and was also awarded Esquire Chef of the Year.

Robbins states that she seeks inspiration from "obscure, weird cookbooks". Jasper White’s Cooking from New England was the first book she owned and she uses The Splendid Table for regional Italian cuisine. While she is strongly influenced by coastal Italian cuisine, she professes to want to explore the cuisine of Calabria, Sardinia and Sicily more, remarking that "There’s always an opportunity to learn because it’s not really just one cuisine, it’s a regional cuisine. Everywhere you go is different, and everywhere within that region every grandmother cooks differently".
