= Five Nights at Freddy's 3 =

2015 video game

- Steam storefront header
- Developer: Scott Cawthon
- Publisher: Scott Cawthon (Note: Clickteam LLC USA published the game for consoles and mobile devices.)
- Series: Five Nights at Freddy's
- Engine: Clickteam Fusion 2.5
- Platforms: Windows; Android; iOS; Nintendo Switch; PlayStation 4; Xbox One
- Release: March 2, 2015: Windows; March 2, 2015; Android; March 6, 2015; iOS; March 12, 2015; Switch, PS4, Xbox One; November 29, 2019
- Genres: Survival horror, point-and-click
- Mode: Single-player

Five Nights at Freddy's 3 (FNaF 3) is a 2015 point-and-click survival horror video game developed and published by Scott Cawthon. It is the third main installment in the Five Nights at Freddy's series, and takes place in a horror-themed attraction based on the restaurant chain featured in the first two games. The player takes on the role of an unnamed security guard who must defend themself from a decrepit animatronic called Springtrap that roams the attraction, while facing "phantom" hallucinations of other animatronics. In order to survive, the player must monitor the building's security cameras while maintaining systems that occasionally shut down. If the player encounters a phantom animatronic, they are jumpscared and one of these systems fails. If Springtrap reaches the office, the player experiences a game over.

The game was revealed in January 2015 through a teaser image on Cawthon's website and an automated response system on his email. Following several additional teasers and a trailer, the game was released for Windows on March 2, 2015. It was later released for Android and iOS on March 6 and March 12 of the same year respectively. The game received mixed reviews from critics, with praise towards the reworked mechanics and gameplay, but mixed reception towards its atmosphere and story. Its successor, Five Nights at Freddy's 4, was released on July 23, 2015. Ports for Nintendo Switch, PlayStation 4, and Xbox One were released on November 29, 2019, alongside the first, second, and fourth installments in the series.

== Gameplay ==
A player checks their camera system, which currently shows Springtrap visible in the feed.

Five Nights at Freddy's 3 is a point-and-click survival horror game. Players take control of a security guard at a soon-to-open horror attraction, known as "Fazbear's Fright", and must complete their shift without being killed by a homicidal animatronic that wanders around the attraction.

Unlike the two previous games, Five Nights at Freddy's 3 features only one animatronic capable of killing the player, that being a rabbit-like character known as "Springtrap", which wanders around the attraction and targets the player's office. Freddy Fazbear, Chica, and Foxy from the first game, alongside Balloon Boy, Marionette, and Mangle from the second game, make appearances as "phantom" animatronics, though these are incapable of killing the player.

The player is unable to leave their office and is defenseless against Springtrap, only able to delay his advancement. They can use two security camera networks to monitor Springtrap's movement, and can halt his progress by strategically opening and closing air vents. The player has access to a set of audio devices through the cameras, which can be used to lure Springtrap away from the office. Alongside the camera and audio systems, the player must maintain the ventilation system. All of these three systems will occasionally fail, requiring the player to reboot them through a lengthy process that leaves them vulnerable. If the ventilation fails for a prolonged period, the player will hallucinate and their vision will be obstructed, causing phantom animatronics to begin appearing.

If a phantom animatronic appears in the office, the player will be jumpscared and one of the systems will fail. If Springtrap enters the office, the player will be jumpscared and killed, causing a game over. After each night, the player can choose to play an Atari-style minigame. These minigames provide backstory for the series. An additional secret minigame can be unlocked each night in order. The way the player completes these secret minigames affects which of two endings the player receives upon completing the game. The game consists of five "nights" and an extra sixth night.

== Plot ==
An unnamed security guard is hired to work night shifts at Fazbear's Fright, a horror-themed attraction based on Freddy Fazbear's Pizza, a family restaurant that closed thirty years prior, where homicidal animatronic characters attacked anyone present after midnight. The player is assigned the night shifts for the week before the opening of Fazbear's Fright, while the team behind the attraction searches for items from the former restaurant to be exhibited. These items include cassette tapes recorded by an employee, which play at the start of the following nights. On the second night, the player learns that the team discovered a derelict yellow rabbit animatronic named "Springtrap", which the protagonist must prevent from entering their office for the duration of the week.

As the week progresses, the cassette tapes discuss a variety of subjects, such as how to operate "springlock suits", which function as both animatronics and as a costume for employees. Another tape mentions safe rooms built at each Freddy Fazbear's Pizza location, which are inaccessible to all people except employees and are unknown to the animatronics and customers. The cassettes on later nights discourage use of the springlock suits after an event that involved "multiple simultaneous springlock failures", and the final message states that the safe rooms were sealed off for unknown reasons.

In between nights, the player is able to play Atari-style minigames that provide insight on the history of the former restaurant. In the first four minigames, the animatronics from the first game are destroyed by an unnamed purple figure. In the fifth minigame, ghosts of the dismantled animatronics corner the figure, prompting him to seek protection by hiding inside a yellow rabbit suit. While inside, its springlock mechanism fails, appearing to crush him to death as the ghosts fade away. Six more secret minigames can be unlocked that focus on specific animatronic characters. The game has two different endings, based on how the player completes the secret minigames. Regardless of the ending, following the sixth night, a newspaper clipping reports that Fazbear's Fright burned down under unknown circumstances and that all salvageable items will be sold at a public auction.

== Release and reception ==
In January 2015, less than three months after the release of Five Nights at Freddy's 2, an image was uploaded to Scott Cawthon's website teasing a third entry in the series. Some time later, an automated response system was set up on Cawthon's email, confirming Five Nights at Freddy's 3 to be in development and requesting fans to not ask questions on the game. Various additional teaser images followed and a trailer was released on January 26. The game was released on March 2, 2015. A mobile port was released for Android devices on March 6, and for iOS on March 12. Ports for Nintendo Switch, PlayStation 4, and Xbox One were released on November 29, 2019, alongside the first, second, and fourth games in the series.

Reviews

Aggregate scores
Aggregator	Score
Metacritic	PC: 68/100
OpenCritic	Critics Recommended: 29%

Review scores
Publication	Score
Destructoid	PC: 6.5/10
Gamezebo	Android: 4.5/5
MeriStation	PC: 7/10
Nintendo Life	NS: 5/10
PC Gamer (US)	PC: 77/100
TouchArcade	MOB: 4/5

Five Nights at Freddy's 3 received "mixed or average" reviews according to review aggregator website Metacritic, assigning the Windows version a score of 68 out of 100 based on seven critic reviews.

The mechanics and gameplay were praised. Omri Petitte of PC Gamer and Nic Rowen from Destructoid praised the reworked camera system, both believing it to be more useful than in previous games and gave the player more reasons to use them. Mitch Vogel of Nintendo Life called the gameplay simpler than previous titles, believing it to be "more of a skill-based game". Nadia Oxford of Gamezebo believed events that took place in the game were easier to keep track of than those in previous games. Other critics praised the character of Springtrap. Rowen liked his inclusion, saying he combined with the reworked mechanics to make "by far the most technically proficient and mechanically satisfying installment yet". Shaun Musgrave of TouchArcade described him as the "most intelligent and ghastly antagonist in the series so far", highlighting his unpredictability. Petitte and Vogel had differing opinions on the game's difficulty, with Petitte believing the game to be intense and consistently give him paranoia and Vogel believing the use of only one animatronic made the game easier.

The game's atmosphere was debated by critics. Petitte wrote that the game was presented well and praised the horror aspect of Springtrap, but believed that the phantom animatronics lacked their original personalities and felt repetitious, an opinion agreed with by Rowen and Vogel. Vogel wrote that the phantom animatronics were unnecessary to the game and considered the weaker horror aspects to be a trade-off with the improved mechanics. Critics were divided over the game's narrative and minigames. Rowen criticized the game as adding "more convoluted layers to the story while offering no real explanations" and described the minigames that are required for the good ending to be a "chore to slog through" and tarnished the rest of the game. Conversely, Oxford believed that Scott Cawthon had "proven his talent" at storytelling and character design, and that he chose a "good place to end things" should the series have been coming to a finish.
