= Game Jolt =

Social community platform for content created by gamers

- Website type: Social community platform for content created by gamers
- Founded: 2003; 23 years ago
- Country of origin: United States
- Owners: Game Jolt, Inc.
- Founders: Yaprak & David DeCarmine
- Website: www.gamejolt.com
- Commercial: Yes
- Registration: Optional
- Current status: Online

Game Jolt is a social community platform for video games, gamers and content creators. Founded by Yaprak and David DeCarmine, it is available on iOS, Android, and on the web and as a desktop app for Windows and Linux. Users share interactive content through a variety of formats including images, videos, live streams, chat rooms, and virtual events.

== Features ==
=== Crowd streaming ===
In 2021 Game Jolt revealed their own live streaming feature called Firesides. Firesides allowed multiple users to simultaneously livestream together with nearly no delay. The feature launched with a virtual concert showcasing its ability to accommodate multiple streamers. On October 16, 2023, Firesides were removed from Game Jolt.

=== Mobile app ===
Game Jolt Social by Game Jolt Inc. launched on both the Apple App Store and Google Play Store in March 2022. "It's clear to us that Gen Z is tired of generic social media and they want a place specifically for gaming that supports all types of content they're creating–art, videos, thoughts, and livestreams all in one place." said Game Jolt founder and CEO Yaprak DeCarmine, in a statement to VentureBeat.

=== Game API ===
The Game Jolt Application Programming Interface (usually known as the Game Jolt Game API) allows any developer using a game development platform that supports HTTP operations and MD5 or SHA-1. Game Jolt advertises that the API can:

- Create multiple "scoreboards" which collect high scores from players made publicly available on the game's profile and give user accounts EXP
- Award player's trophies which give user accounts EXP
- Store game data on Game Jolt's data servers
- Log whether a user is currently playing a game they're logged into via the GJAPI

== Game jams and competitions ==
Game Jolt regularly hosts game jams where participants are encouraged to develop games for a chance to win prizes. They hosted their first game jam in 2009, Shocking Contest.

In November 2014, Game Jolt announced the "Indies vs PewDiePie" game jam, partnering with the popular YouTuber Felix "PewDiePie" Kjellberg. Developers were given a weekend (21–24 November) to create a game with the theme of "fun to play, fun to watch" to suit the Let's Plays entertainment style. Users could rate entries afterwards until December 1 when the scores were counted up. The prize to the top 10 rated games was Felix playing the games on his channel as a means of promotion for the developers, although later he played other entries. One of the participants of the jam, now known as Outerminds Inc. was discovered and hired by PewDiePie to develop his mobile game, Legend of the Brofist.

Game Jolt partnered with Felix, Sean "Jacksepticeye" McLoughlin and Mark "Markiplier" Fischbach to host "Indies vs Gamers" in July 2015. The requirements for entries were arcade games using the Game Jolt Game API highscore tables, to be made between the July 17–20 and the top 5 games were played on the partner's YouTube channels.

Following the "Indies vs PewDiePie" game jam in 2014, Game Jolt released their internal jam hosting tools public for all users to use as a service, to create their own game jams that integrated with the main site.

Today, Game Jolt focuses on hosting and co-hosting game competitions with established brands in order to bring monetary and educational opportunities to their users. On April 15, 2024, an announcement was made about a collaboration with Pocket Worlds for the "HighRise Game Jam". Pocket Worlds had sold NFTs up until roughly 2022, causing a community outburst. The situation was addressed, and the situation started to disperse.

== Contests ==
Date	Theme	Place		
Date	Theme	1st	2nd	3rd
13–21 June 2009	Shocking	ShockMaze	Infidels	Shocker: The Electrifying Hero
1–31 August	Axiom	Raimond Ex	Paul Moose In Space World	No Longer Apart
1–7 November 2009	Minimal	Spectrum Wing	Saut	Fetus
24–25 January 2010	Rogue	Super Space Rogues	Tower Climb	Flood the Chamber
1–8 July 2010	Indie Game Demake	Warning Foregone	Sulkeis	Saucelifter 8-bit
16 January–14 February 2011	Invention Contest	Fire With a Riot	Bun Dun	Monica
20 August–24 September 2011	Music Interpretation	Je Suis Le Diable	Rhythmical	Jeremy
11–19 August 2012	Fear	The Room	Fragments of Fear	Nyctophobia
1–11 March 2013	Chaos	Void Rogue	Blues for Mittavinda	Stellar Zero
9–18 March 2013	Party	Quantum Party Crasher	Super Clean Clean	Party Run
21–24 November 2014	Fun to play and watch (Indies vs PewDiePie)	Lord of the Horde	Kid VS School	DANCE!DANCE! PewDiePie
17–20 July 2015	High scores (Indies VS Gamers)	Racket Boy	Sushido	Super Nanny Sleepytime Ultra HD Alpha Omega
29 July–13 August 2021	Opera GX Game Maker Jam	OPERIUS won $10,000 USD	OH NO! ALIENS STOLE MY WIFI won $7,000 USD	NETTIE AND SETTIE SAVE THE INTERNET won $3,000 USD
17 June–3 July 2022	Together Jam	TBA	TBA	TBA
5–8 August 2022	Girls in Games Jam	TBA	TBA	TBA

== Events ==
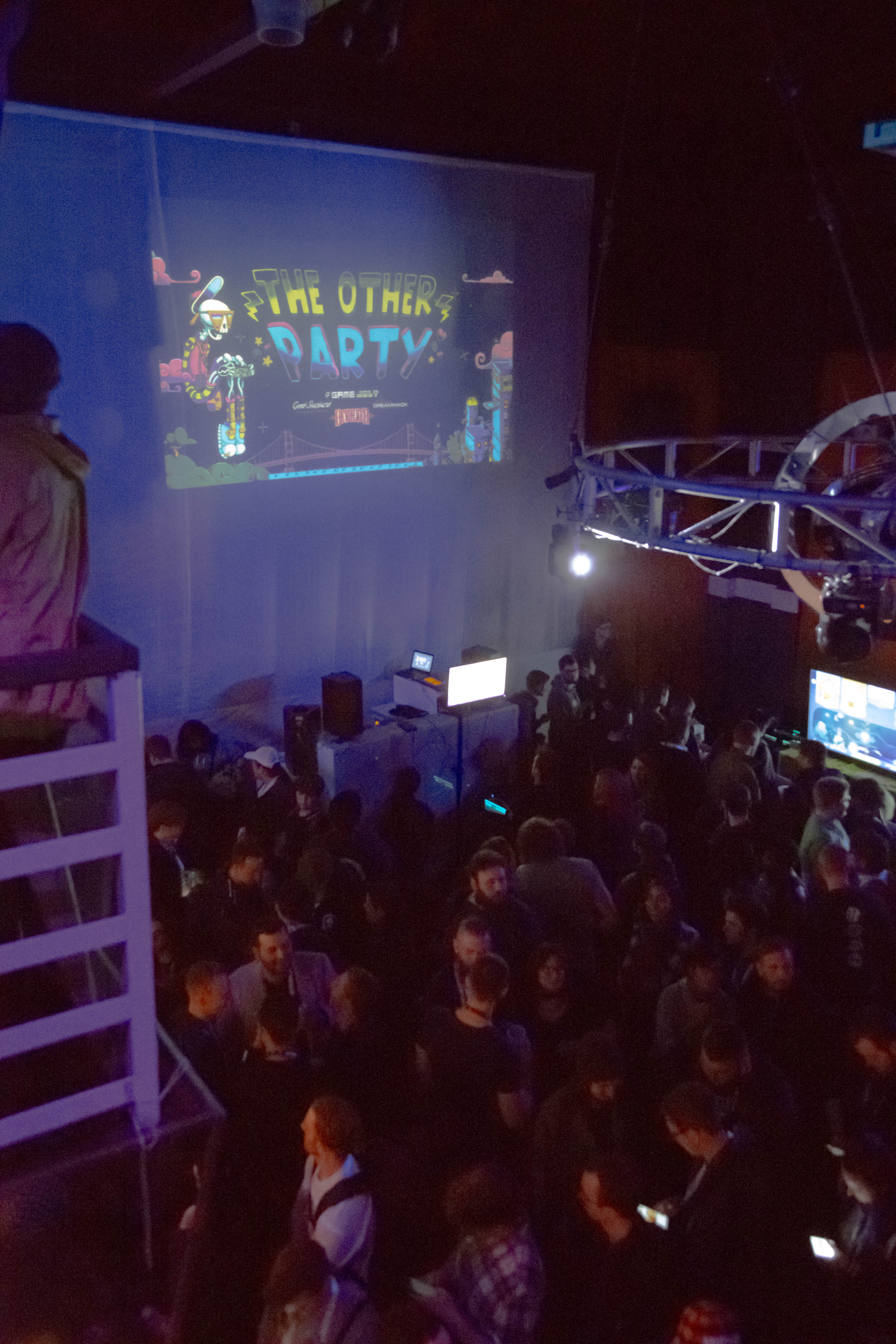
Photograph from one of the events, known as "The Other Party"

Game Jolt hosts both physical and virtual events to entertain and prank its users, which consists of the following:

Year	Event name	Location
2016	Game Jolt Develop: Party!	Brighton, United Kingdom
2018	The Other Party at GDC by Game Jolt, DreamHack, Devolver Digital, Good Shepherd	San Francisco, California, USA
2019	Indiepocalypse at GDC by Game Jolt, Devolver Digital, Good Shepherd and DreamHack	San Francisco, California, USA
2019	Indie Forest PAX West Party by Game Jolt, DreamHack and Devolver Digital	Seattle, Washington, USA

== History ==
Game Jolt has supported independent creators with a central platform to manage their content and communities since its start in 2003. David DeCarmine began development of Game Jolt at the age of 14 for a group of hobbyists, making games and sharing on forums in an early iteration known as Holo World. The original intention was to create a platform for gamers where new games could be discoverable and quickly playable, and where feedback could be provided directly to the creators, allowing them to continue improving their games.

In 2008, Game Jolt was registered as an LLC, then incorporated as Game Jolt Inc. in September 2020.

A new site launched in 2015 featuring a responsive design, automated curation for both games and game news articles which weighs how recent a game was uploaded and how popular it is ("hot") and filtering options on game listings for platform, maturity rating and development status.

In March 2022, Game Jolt launched a mobile application simultaneously on the Google Play Store and Apple App Store targeted at Gen Z gamers and creators. While in beta, the mobile app had 100,000 installs pre-launch.

=== Game store ===
Game Jolt continues to host a large library of independent games. Game developers can upload their games directly to the site to share or sell.

They would allow distribution for downloadable games, later adding support for Adobe Flash, Unity and Java games which allowed support for browser based games. In February 2013, Game Jolt built support for browser-based HTML5 games as well. A user levelling system was released into public beta in April 2013, incorporating the GJAPI trophies and highscores, as well as site activity, to generate 'EXP' (experience points).

Game Jolt Jams released in early 2014 as a service to allow users to create their own game jams that integrated with the main site.

In April 2016, an online marketplace was announced and released the following month with an exclusive set of game titles, including Bendy and the Ink Machine, allowing developers to sell their games on the site.

In January 2016, Game Jolt released source code of the client and site's front end on GitHub under MIT license.

In January 2022, Game Jolt banned adult games from appearing on the site, stating in an email to developers that the site had become a "social media platform" and they "had to make decisions around the direction and future of the brand which has now included the removal of hosted games with explicitly adult content." In response to a tweet by Itch.io saying the site is not for prudes, they wrote in their own tweet: "Game Jolt is a platform with a large audience of 13-16 year olds. Our users asked us to clean up, so here we are."

== Investments ==
After bootstrapping Game Jolt with revenue earned from ads on the website for years, the DeCarmines secured venture capital in 2020 from SoftBank, doing so again in 2021 from founders of Twitch, Rec Room, Modio and more.
