= Timeline of programming languages =

This is a record of notable programming languages, by decade.

== 1790s ==
Year	Name	Developer	Predecessor(s)
1790	Jacquard loom (concept)	Joseph Marie Jacquard	

== 1800s ==
Year	Name	Developer	Predecessor(s)
1801	Jacquard machine (implementation)	Joseph Marie Jacquard	none (unique language)

== 1830s ==
Year	Name	Developer	Predecessor(s)
1837	BAB L1	Charles Babbage	Jacquard

== 1840s ==
Year	Name	Developer	Predecessor(s)
1843	Note G	Ada Lovelace	none (unique language)

== 1870s ==
Year	Name	Developer	Predecessor(s)
1879	Begriffsschrift	Gottlob Frege	none (unique language)

== 1940s ==
Year	Name	Chief developer, company	Predecessor(s)
1943–45/46	Plankalkül	Konrad Zuse	none (unique language)
1943–46	ENIAC coding system	John von Neumann, John Mauchly, J. Presper Eckert, and Herman Goldstine after Alan Turing	none (unique language)
1946	ENIAC Short Code	Richard Clippinger and John von Neumann after Alan Turing	none (unique language)
1947–52	ARC/Birkbeck Assembler	Kathleen Booth	ENIAC Short Code
1948	Plankalkül (year of publication)	Konrad Zuse	
1949	EDSAC Initial Orders	David Wheeler	ENIAC coding system
1949	Short Code (originally known as Brief Code)	John Mauchly and William F. Schmitt	ENIAC Short Code
Year	Name	Chief developer, company	Predecessor(s)

== 1950s ==
Year	Name	Chief developer, company	Predecessor(s)
1950	Short Code (for UNIVAC I)	William F. Schmitt	Short Code
1951	Superplan	Heinz Rutishauser	Plankalkül
1951	ALGAE	Edward A. Voorhees, Karl Balke	none (unique language)
1951	Intermediate Programming Language	Arthur Burks	Short Code
1951	Boehm unnamed coding system	Corrado Böhm	CPC Coding scheme
1951	Klammerausdrücke	Konrad Zuse	Plankalkül
1951	Stanislaus (Notation)	Fritz Bauer	none (unique language)
1951	Sort Merge Generator	Betty Holberton	none (unique language)
1952	Short Code (for UNIVAC II)	Albert B. Tonik, J. R. Logan	Short Code (for UNIVAC I)
1952	A-0	Grace Hopper	Short Code
1952	Glennie Autocode	Alick Glennie	CPC Coding scheme
1952	Operator programming	Alexey Andreevich Lyapunov with the participation Kateryna Yushchenko	MESM
1952	Editing Generator	Milly Koss	SORT/MERGE
1952	COMPOOL	RAND/SDC	none (unique language)
1953	Speedcoding	John W. Backus	none (unique language
1953	READ/PRINT	Don Harroff, James Fishman, George Ryckman	none (unique language)
1954	Laning and Zierler system	J. Halcombe Laning, Niel Zierler, Adams at MIT Project Whirlwind	none (unique language
1954	Mark I Autocode	Tony Brooker	Glennie Autocode
1954	ARITH-MATIC	Team led by Grace Hopper at UNIVAC	A-0
1954	MATH-MATIC	Team led by Charles Katz	A-0
1954	MATRIX MATH	H G Kahrimanian	none (unique language)
1954	IPL I (concept)	Allen Newell, Cliff Shaw, Herbert A. Simon	none (unique language)
1954–55	FORTRAN (concept)	Team led by John W. Backus at IBM	Speedcoding
1955	Address programming language	Kateryna Yushchenko	Operator programming
1955	FLOW-MATIC	Team led by Grace Hopper at UNIVAC	A-0
1955	BACAIC	M. Grems, R. Porter	
1955	PACT I	SHARE	FORTRAN, A-2
1955	Freiburger Code	University of Freiburg	none (unique language)
1955	PRINT	IBM	
1955–56	Sequentielle Formelübersetzung	Fritz Bauer, Karl Samelson	Boehm
1955–56	IT	Team led by Alan Perlis	Laning and Zierler
1956–58	LISP (concept)	John McCarthy	IPL
1957	COMTRAN	Bob Bemer	FLOW-MATIC
1957	GEORGE	Charles Leonard Hamblin	none (unique language)
1957	FORTRAN I (implementation)	John W. Backus at IBM	FORTRAN
1957	COMIT (concept)	Victor Yngve	none (unique language)
1957–58	UNICODE	Remington Rand UNIVAC	MATH-MATIC
1958	FORTRAN II	Team led by John W. Backus at IBM	FORTRAN I
1958	ALGOL 58 (IAL)	ACM/GAMM	FORTRAN, IT, Sequentielle Formelübersetzung
1958	IPL II (implementation)	Allen Newell, Cliff Shaw, Herbert A. Simon	IPL I
1958	IPL V	Allen Newell, Cliff Shaw, Herbert A. Simon	IPL II
1959	APT	Douglas T. Ross	
1959	FACT	Fletcher R. Jones, Roy Nutt, Robert L. Patrick	none (unique language)
1959	COBOL (concept)	The CODASYL Committee	FLOW-MATIC, COMTRAN, FACT
1959	JOVIAL	Jules Schwartz at SDC	ALGOL 58
1959	LISP (implementation)	Steve Russell	IPL
1959	MAD – Michigan Algorithm Decoder	Bruce Arden, Bernard Galler, Robert M. Graham	ALGOL 58
1959	TRAC (concept)	Calvin Mooers	
Year	Name	Chief developer, company	Predecessor(s)

== 1960s ==
Year	Name	Chief developer, company	Predecessor(s)
1960	ALGOL 60		ALGOL 58
1960	COBOL 61 (implementation)	The CODASYL Committee	FLOW-MATIC, COMTRAN
1960	SAKO	Leon Łukaszewicz, et al., Polish Academy of Sciences	none (unique language)
1961	COMIT (implementation)	Victor Yngve	none (unique language)
1961	GPSS	Geoffrey Gordon, IBM	none (unique language)
1962	FORTRAN IV	IBM	FORTRAN II
1962	APL (concept)	Kenneth E. Iverson	none (unique language)
1962	Simula (concept)	Ole-Johan Dahl (mostly)	ALGOL 60
1962	SNOBOL	Ralph Griswold, et al.	FORTRAN II, COMIT
1963	Combined Programming Language (CPL) (concept)	Barron, Christopher Strachey, et al.	ALGOL 60
1963	SNOBOL3	Griswold, et al.	SNOBOL
1963	ALGOL 68 (concept)	Adriaan van Wijngaarden, et al.	ALGOL 60
1963	JOSS I	Cliff Shaw, RAND	ALGOL 58
1964	MIMIC	H. E. Petersen, et al.	MIDAS
1964	COWSEL	Rod Burstall, Robin Popplestone	CPL, LISP
1964	PL/I (concept)	IBM	ALGOL 60, COBOL, FORTRAN
1964	Basic Assembly Language	IBM	Assembly language
1964	BASIC	John George Kemeny, Thomas Eugene Kurtz at Dartmouth College	FORTRAN II, JOSS
1964	IBM RPG	IBM	FARGO
1964	Mark-IV	Informatics	
1964	Speakeasy-2	Stanley Cohen at Argonne National Laboratory	Speakeasy
1964	TRAC (implementation)	Calvin Mooers	
1964	P′′	Corrado Böhm	none (unique language)
1964?	IITRAN		
1965	RPG II	IBM	FARGO, RPG
1965	MAD/I (concept)	University of Michigan	MAD, ALGOL 60, PL/I
1965	TELCOMP	BBN	JOSS
1965	Atlas Autocode	Tony Brooker, Derrick Morris at Manchester University	ALGOL 60, Autocode
1965	PL360 (concept)	Niklaus Wirth	ALGOL 60, ESPOL
1966	JOSS II	Chuck Baker, RAND	JOSS I
1966	ALGOL W	Niklaus Wirth, C. A. R. Hoare	ALGOL 60
1966	FORTRAN 66	John Backus and his team	FORTRAN IV
1966	ISWIM (concept)	Peter J. Landin	LISP
1966	CORAL 66	I. F. Currie, M. Griffiths	ALGOL 60
1966	APL (implementation)	Kenneth E. Iverson	none (unique language)
1967	BCPL	Martin Richards	CPL
1967	MUMPS	Massachusetts General Hospital	FORTRAN, TELCOMP
1967	Simula 67 (implementation)	Ole-Johan Dahl, Bjørn Myhrhaug, Kristen Nygaard at Norsk Regnesentral	ALGOL 60
1967	Interlisp	D.G. Bobrow and D.L. Murphy	Lisp
1967	EXAPT	Herwart Opitz, Wilhelm Simon, Günter Spur, and Gottfried Stute at RWTH Aachen University and TU Berlin	APT
1967	SNOBOL4	Ralph Griswold, et al.	SNOBOL3
1967	XPL	William M. McKeeman, et al. at University of California, Santa Cruz; J. J. Horning, et al. at Stanford University	PL/I
1968	ALGOL 68 (UNESCO/IFIP standard)	Adriaan van Wijngaarden, Barry J. Mailloux, John E. L. Peck and Cornelis H. A. Koster, et al.	ALGOL 60
1968	COBOL 1968	American National Standard COBOL (X3.23-1968)	COBOL
1968	POP-1	Rod Burstall, Robin Popplestone	COWSEL
1968	DIBOL-8	DEC	DIBOL
1968	Forth (concept)	Moore	
1968	Logo	Wally Feurzeig, Seymour Papert, Cynthia Solomon	LISP
1968	MAPPER	Unisys	CRT RPS
1968	REFAL (implementation)	Valentin Turchin	none (unique language)
1968	TTM (implementation)	Steven Caine and E. Kent Gordon, California Institute of Technology	GAP, GPM
1968	PILOT	John Amsden Starkweather, University of California, San Francisco	Computest
1968	PL360 (implementation)	Niklaus Wirth	ALGOL 60, ESPOL
1968	PL/S (as Basic Systems Language)	IBM	Assembly language
1969	PL/I (implementation)	IBM	ALGOL 60, COBOL, FORTRAN
1969	B	Ken Thompson, with contributions from Dennis Ritchie	BCPL, Fortran
1969	Polymorphic Programming Language (PPL)	Thomas A. Standish at Harvard University	
1969	SETL	Jack Schwartz at Courant Institute of Mathematical Sciences	ALGOL 60
1969	TUTOR	Paul Tenczar & University of Illinois at Urbana–Champaign	
1969	Edinburgh IMP	Edinburgh University	ALGOL 60, Autocode, Atlas Autocode
Year	Name	Chief developer, company	Predecessor(s)

== 1970s ==
Year	Name	Chief developer, company	Predecessor(s)
1970	Forth (implementation)	Charles H. Moore	
1970	POP-2	Robin Popplestone	POP-1
1970	SAIL	Dan Swinehart, Bob Sproull	ALGOL 60
1970	Pascal	Niklaus Wirth, Kathleen Jensen	ALGOL 60, ALGOL W
1970	BLISS	Wulf, Russell, Habermann at Carnegie Mellon University	ALGOL
1971	KRL	Daniel G. Bobrow at Xerox PARC, Terry Winograd at Stanford University	KM, FRL (MIT)
1971	Compiler Description Language (CDL)	Cornelis H.A. Koster at University of Nijmegen	
1972	Smalltalk-72	Alan Kay, Adele Goldberg, Dan Ingalls, Xerox PARC	Simula 67
1972	PL/M	Gary Kildall at Digital Research	PL/I, ALGOL, XPL
1972	C	Dennis Ritchie	B, BCPL, ALGOL 68
1972	INTERCAL	Don Woods, James M. Lyon	none (unique language)
1972	Prolog	Alain Colmerauer	2-level W-Grammar
1972	Structured Query language (SQL)	IBM	ALPHA, Quel (Ingres)
1972	SASL	David Turner at University of St Andrews	ISWIM
1973	COMAL	Børge Christensen, Benedict Løfstedt	Pascal, BASIC
1973	ML	Robin Milner	
1973	LIS	Jean Ichbiah et al. at CII Honeywell Bull	Pascal, Sue
1973	Speakeasy-3	Stanley Cohen, Steven Pieper at Argonne National Laboratory	Speakeasy-2
1974	CLU	Barbara Liskov	ALGOL 60, Lisp, Simula
1974	GRASS	Thomas A. DeFanti	BASIC
1974	COBOL 1974	ANSI X3.23-1974	COBOL 1968
1974	BASIC FOUR	MAI BASIC Four Inc.	Business BASIC
1974	PROSE modeling language	CDC 6600 Cybernet Services	SLANG, FORTRAN
1974	sed	Lee E. McMahon of Bell Labs	ed
1975	ABC	Leo Geurts and Lambert Meertens	SETL
1975	PROSE modeling language Time-Sharing Version	CDC 6400 Cybernet KRONOS Services	SLANG, FORTRAN
1975	Scheme	Gerald Jay Sussman, Guy L. Steele Jr.	LISP
1975	Altair BASIC	Bill Gates, Paul Allen	BASIC
1975	Modula	Niklaus Wirth	Pascal
1976	Smalltalk-76	Xerox PARC	Smalltalk-72
1976	Mesa	Xerox PARC	ALGOL
1976	Ratfor	Brian Kernighan	C, FORTRAN
1976	S	John Chambers at Bell Labs	APL, PPL, Scheme
1976	SAS	SAS Institute	
1976	Integer BASIC	Steve Wozniak	BASIC
1977	FP	John Backus	none (unique language)
1977	Bourne Shell (sh)	Stephen R. Bourne	none (unique language)
1977	Commodore BASIC	Jack Tramiel	BASIC
1977	IDL	David Stern of Research Systems Inc	Fortran
1977	Standard MUMPS		MUMPS
1977	Icon (concept)	Ralph Griswold	SNOBOL
1977	Euclid	Butler Lampson at Xerox PARC, Ric Holt and James Cordy at University of Toronto	
1977	Applesoft BASIC	Marc McDonald and Ric Weiland	BASIC
1978	RAPT	Pat Ambler and Robin Popplestone	APT
1978	C shell	Bill Joy	C
1978	RPG III	IBM	FARGO, RPG, RPG II
1978	HAL/S	designed by Intermetrics for NASA	XPL
1978	Applesoft II BASIC	Marc McDonald and Ric Weiland	Applesoft BASIC
1978?	MATLAB	Cleve Moler at the University of New Mexico	Fortran
1978?	SMALL	Nevil Brownlee at the University of Auckland	Algol60
1978	VisiCalc	Dan Bricklin, Bob Frankston marketed by VisiCorp	none (unique language)
1979	TI BASIC (TI 99/4A)	Texas Instruments	BASIC
1979	Modula-2	Niklaus Wirth	Modula, Mesa
1979	REXX	Mike Cowlishaw at IBM	PL/I, BASIC, EXEC 2
1979	AWK	Alfred Aho, Peter J. Weinberger, Brian Kernighan	C, SNOBOL
1979	Icon (implementation)	Ralph Griswold	SNOBOL
1979	Vulcan dBase-II	Wayne Ratliff	RETRIEVE
Year	Name	Chief developer, company	Predecessor(s)

== 1980s ==
Year	Name	Chief developer, company	Predecessor(s)
1980	Ada 80 (MIL-STD-1815)	Jean Ichbiah at CII Honeywell Bull	ALGOL 68, Green
1980	C with Classes	Bjarne Stroustrup	C, Simula 67
1980	Applesoft III	Apple Computer	Applesoft II BASIC
1980	Apple III Microsoft BASIC	Microsoft	Microsoft BASIC
1980–81	CBASIC	Gordon Eubanks	BASIC, Compiler Systems, Digital Research
1980	Smalltalk-80	Adele Goldberg at Xerox PARC	Smalltalk-76
1981	TI Extended BASIC	Texas Instruments	TI BASIC (TI 99/4A)
1981	BBC BASIC	Acorn Computers, Sophie Wilson	BASIC
1981	IBM BASICA	Microsoft	BASIC
1982?	Speakeasy-IV	Stanley Cohen, et al. at Speakeasy Computing Corporation	Speakeasy-3
1982?	Draco	Chris Gray	Pascal, C, ALGOL 68
1982	PostScript	Warnock	InterPress
1982	Turing	Ric Holt and James Cordy, at University of Toronto	Euclid
1983	GW-BASIC	Microsoft	IBM BASICA
1983	Turbo Pascal	Hejlsberg at Borland	Pascal
1983	Ada 83 (ANSI/MIL-STD-1815A)	Jean Ichbiah at Alsys	Ada 80, Green
1983	Objective-C	Brad Cox	Smalltalk, C
1983	C++	Bjarne Stroustrup	C with Classes
1983	True BASIC	John George Kemeny, Thomas Eugene Kurtz at Dartmouth College	BASIC
1983	occam	David May	EPL
1983?	ABAP	SAP AG	
1983	KornShell (ksh)	David Korn	sh
1983	Clascal	Apple Computer	Pascal
1984	CLIPPER	Nantucket	dBase
1984	Common Lisp	Guy L. Steele, Jr., many others	LISP
1984	Rocq (then: Coq)	INRIA	
1984	RPL	Hewlett-Packard	Forth, Lisp
1984	Standard ML		ML
1984	Redcode	Alexander Dewdney and D.G. Jones	
1984	OPL	Psion	BASIC
1985	COBOL 1985	ISO/IEC 1989:1985	COBOL 74
1985	PARADOX	Borland	dBase
1985	QuickBASIC	Microsoft	BASIC
1986	Clarion	Bruce Barrington	
1986	CorVision	Cortex	INFORM
1986	Eiffel	Bertrand Meyer	Simula 67, Ada
1986	GFA BASIC	Frank Ostrowski	BASIC
1986	Informix-4GL	Informix	
1986	LabVIEW	National Instruments	
1986	Miranda	David Turner at University of Kent	SASL
1986	Object Pascal	Apple Computer	Pascal
1986	PROMAL		C
1986	Erlang	Joe Armstrong and others in Ericsson	PLEX, Prolog
1987	Ada ISO 8652:1987	ANSI/MIL-STD-1815A unchanged	Ada 83
1987	Self (concept)	Sun Microsystems Inc.	Smalltalk
1987	occam 2	David May and INMOS	occam
1987	HyperTalk	Apple Computer	none (unique language)
1987	Clean	Software Technology Research Group of Radboud University Nijmegen	none (unique language)
1987	Perl	Larry Wall	C, sed, awk, sh
1987	Oberon	Niklaus Wirth	Modula-2
1987	Turbo Basic	Robert 'Bob' Zale	BASIC/Z
1988	Mathematica (Wolfram Language)	Wolfram Research	none (unique language), though borrowing some syntax from C and certain functionalities of lists from LISP
1988	Octave		MATLAB
1988	Tcl	John Ousterhout	Awk, Lisp
1988	STOS BASIC	François Lionet and Constantin Sotiropoulos	BASIC
1988	Actor	Charles Duff, the Whitewater Group	Forth, Smalltalk
1988	Object REXX	Simon C. Nash	REXX, Smalltalk
1988	SPARK	Bernard A. Carré	Ada
1988	A+	Arthur Whitney	APL, A
1988	Hamilton C shell	Nicole Hamilton	C shell
1988–1989	C90	C90 ISO/IEC 9899:1990	C
1989	Turbo Pascal OOP	Anders Hejlsberg at Borland	Turbo Pascal, Object Pascal
1989	Modula-3	Cardeli, et al. DEC and Olivetti	Modula-2
1989	PowerBASIC	Robert 'Bob' Zale	Turbo Basic
1989	VisSim	Peter Darnell, Visual Solutions	
1989	LPC	Lars Pensjö	
1989	Bash	Brian Fox	Bourne shell, C shell, KornShell
1989	Magik	Arthur Chance, of Smallworld Systems Ltd	Smalltalk
Year	Name	Chief developer, company	Predecessor(s)

== 1990s ==
Year	Name	Chief developer, company	Predecessor(s)
1990	Sather	Steve Omohundro	Eiffel
1990	AMOS BASIC	François Lionet and Constantin Sotiropoulos	STOS BASIC
1990	AMPL	Robert Fourer, David Gay and Brian Kernighan at Bell Laboratories	
1990	Object Oberon	H Mössenböck, J Templ, R Griesemer	Oberon
1990	J	Kenneth E. Iverson, Roger Hui at Iverson Software	APL, FP
1990	Haskell		Miranda, Clean
1990	EuLisp		Common Lisp, Scheme
1990	Z shell (zsh)	Paul Falstad at Princeton University	ksh
1990	SKILL	T. J. Barnes at Cadence Design Systems	Franz Lisp
1991	GNU E	David J. DeWitt, Michael J. Carey	C++
1991	Oberon-2	Hanspeter Mössenböck, Niklaus Wirth	Object Oberon
1991	Oz	Gert Smolka and his students	Prolog
1991	Q	Albert Gräf	
1991	Python	Guido van Rossum	Perl, ABC, C
1991	Visual Basic	Alan Cooper, sold to Microsoft	QuickBASIC
1992	Borland Pascal		Turbo Pascal OOP
1992	Dylan	Many people at Apple Computer	Common Lisp, Scheme
1992	S-Lang	John E. Davis	PostScript
1993?	Self (implementation)	Sun Microsystems	Smalltalk
1993	Amiga E	Wouter van Oortmerssen	DEX, C, Modula-2
1993	Brainfuck	Urban Müller	P′′
1993	LiveCode Transcript		HyperTalk
1993	AppleScript	Apple Computer	HyperTalk
1993	K	Arthur Whitney	APL, Lisp
1993	Lua	Roberto Ierusalimschy et al. at Tecgraf, PUC-Rio	Scheme, SNOBOL, Modula, CLU, C++
1993	R	Robert Gentleman and Ross Ihaka	S
1993	ZPL	Chamberlain et al. at University of Washington	C
1993	NewtonScript	Walter Smith	Self, Dylan
1993	Euphoria	Robert Craig	SNOBOL, AWK, ABC, Icon, Python
1994	Claire	Yves Caseau	Smalltalk, SETL, OPS5, Lisp, ML, C, LORE, LAURE
1994	ANSI Common Lisp		Common Lisp
1994	RAPID	ABB	ARLA
1994	Pike	Fredrik Hübinette et al. at Linköping University	LPC, C, μLPC
1994	ANS Forth	Elizabeth Rather, et al.	Forth
1995	Ada 95	S. Tucker Taft, et al. at Intermetrics	Ada 83
1995	Borland Delphi	Anders Hejlsberg at Borland	Borland Pascal
1995	ColdFusion (CFML)	Allaire	
1995	Java	James Gosling at Sun Microsystems	C, Simula 67, C++, Smalltalk, Ada 83, Objective-C, Mesa
1995	LiveScript	Brendan Eich at Netscape	Self, C, Scheme
1995	Mercury	Zoltan Somogyi at University of Melbourne	Prolog, Hope, Haskell
1995	PHP	Rasmus Lerdorf	Perl
1995	Ruby	Yukihiro Matsumoto	Smalltalk, Perl
1995	JavaScript	Brendan Eich at Netscape	LiveScript
1995	Racket	Matthew Flatt at Rice University	Scheme, Lisp
1996	CSS	Håkon Wium Lie and Bert Bos	SGML
1996	Curl	David Kranz, Steve Ward, Chris Terman at MIT	Lisp, C++, Tcl/Tk, TeX, HTML
1996	Lasso	Blue World Communications	
1996	NetRexx	Mike Cowlishaw	REXX
1996	OCaml	INRIA	Caml Light, Standard ML
1996	Perl Data Language (PDL)	Karl Glazebrook, Jarle Brinchmann, Tuomas Lukka, and Christian Soeller	APL, Perl
1996	Pure Data	Miller Puckette	Max
1996	VBScript	Microsoft	Visual Basic
1997	Component Pascal	Oberon Microsystems	Oberon-2
1997	E	Mark S. Miller	Joule, Original-E
1997	Squeak	Alan Kay, et al. at Apple Computer	Smalltalk-80, Self
1997	ECMAScript	ECMA TC39-TG1	JavaScript
1997	ISLISP	ISO Standard ISLISP	Common Lisp
1997	Tea	Jorge Nunes	Java, Scheme, Tcl
1997	REBOL	Carl Sassenrath, Rebol Technologies	Self, Forth, Lisp, Logo
1998	Logtalk	Paulo Moura (then at University of Coimbra)	Prolog
1998	ActionScript	Gary Grossman	ECMAScript
1998	Standard C++	ANSI/ISO Standard C++	C++, Standard C, C
1998	PureBasic	Frederic Laboureur, Fantaisie Software	
1998	UnrealScript	Tim Sweeney at Epic Games	C++, Java
1998	XSLT (+ XPath)	W3C, James Clark	DSSSL
1998	Xojo (REALbasic at the time)	Xojo, Andrew Barry	Visual Basic
1999	C99	C99 ISO/IEC 9899:1999	C90
1999	Gambas	Benoît Minisini	Visual Basic, Java
1999	Game Maker Language (GML)	Mark Overmars	Game Maker
Year	Name	Chief developer, company	Predecessor(s)

== 2000s ==
Year	Name	Chief developer, company	Predecessor(s)
2000	Join Java	G Stewart von Itzstein	Java
2000	DarkBASIC	The Game Creators	
2000	C#	Anders Hejlsberg, Microsoft (ECMA)	C, C++, Java, Delphi, Modula-2
2001	Joy	Manfred von Thun	FP, Forth
2001	AspectJ	Gregor Kiczales, Xerox PARC	Java, Common Lisp
2001	D	Walter Bright, Digital Mars	C, C++, C#, Java
2001	Processing	Casey Reas and Benjamin Fry	Java, C, C++
2001	Visual Basic (.NET)	Microsoft	Visual Basic
2001	GDScript (GDS)	Juan Linietsky, Ariel Manzur (OKAM Studio)	Godot
2001	Shakespeare Programming Language	Jon Åslund, Karl Hasselström	
2002	Io	Steve Dekorte	Self, NewtonScript, Lua
2002	Gosu	Guidewire Software	GScript
2002	Scratch	Mitchel Resnick, Yasmin Kafai, John Maloney, Natalie Rusk, Evelyn Eastmond, Tammy Stern, Amon Millner, Jay Silver, and Brian Silverman	Logo, Smalltalk, Squeak, E-Toys, HyperCard, AgentSheets, StarLogo, Tweak
2003	Nix	Eelco Dolstra	Miranda/SASL, Haskell
2003	Nemerle	University of Wrocław	C#, ML, MetaHaskell
2003	Factor	Slava Pestov	Joy, Forth, Lisp
2003	Scala	Martin Odersky	Smalltalk, Java, Haskell, Standard ML, OCaml
2003	COBOL 2002	ISO/IEC 1989:2002	COBOL 1985
2003	C++03	C++ ISO/IEC 14882:2003	C++, Standard C, C
2003	Squirrel	Alberto Demichelis	Lua
2003	Boo	Rodrigo B. de Oliveira	Python, C#
2004	Subtext	Jonathan Edwards	none (unique language)
2004	Alma-0	Krzysztof Apt, Centrum Wiskunde & Informatica	none (unique language)
2004	FreeBASIC	Andre Victor	QBasic
2004	Groovy	James Strachan	Java
2004	Little b	Aneil Mallavarapu, Harvard Medical School, Department of Systems Biology	Lisp
2005	Fantom	Brian Frank, Andy Frank	C#, Scala, Ruby, Erlang
2005	F#	Don Syme, Microsoft Research	OCaml, C#, Haskell
2005	Haxe	Nicolas Cannasse	ActionScript, OCaml, Java
2005	Oxygene	RemObjects Software	Object Pascal, C#
2005	Seed7	Thomas Mertes	none (unique language)
2005	fish	Axel Liljencrantz	none (unique language)
2005	HolyC	Terry A. Davis	C, C++
2006	Cobra	Chuck Esterbrook	Python, C#, Eiffel, Objective-C
2006	PowerShell	Microsoft	C#, ksh, Perl, CL, DCL, SQL
2006	OptimJ	Ateji	Java
2006	Fortress	Guy L. Steele Jr.	Scala, ML, Haskell
2006	Vala	GNOME	C#
2007	Ada 2005	Ada Rapporteur Group	Ada 95
2007	Agda	Ulf Norell	Rocq, Epigram, Haskell
2007	QB64	Galleon, QB64Team	QBasic
2007	Clojure	Rich Hickey	Lisp, ML, Haskell, Erlang
2007	LOLCODE	Adam Lindsay	none (unique language)
2007	Oberon-07	Niklaus Wirth	Oberon
2007	Swift (parallel scripting language)	University of Chicago, Argonne National Laboratory	
2008	Nim	Andreas Rumpf	Python, Lisp, Object Pascal
2008	Pure	Albert Gräf	Q
2009	Chapel	Brad Chamberlain, Cray Inc.	HPF, ZPL
2009	Go	Google	C, Oberon, Limbo, Smalltalk
2009	CoffeeScript	Jeremy Ashkenas	JavaScript, Ruby, Python, Haskell
2009	Idris	Edwin Brady	Haskell, Agda, Rocq
2009	Parasail	S. Tucker Taft, AdaCore	Modula, Ada, Pascal, ML
2009	Whiley	David J. Pearce	Java, C, Python
2009	Dafny	K. Rustan M. Leino	Java, Spec#
Year	Name	Chief developer, company	Predecessor(s)

== 2010s ==
Year	Name	Chief developer, company	Predecessor(s)
2010	Rust	Graydon Hoare, Mozilla	Alef, C++, Camlp4, Erlang, Hermes, Limbo, Napier, Napier88, Newsqueak, NIL, Sather, Standard ML
2011	C11	C11 ISO/IEC 9899:2011	C99
2011	Ceylon	Gavin King, Red Hat	Java
2011	Dart	Google	Java, JavaScript, CoffeeScript, Go
2011	C++11	C++ ISO/IEC 14882:2011	C++, Standard C, C
2011	Kotlin	JetBrains	Java, Scala, Groovy, C#, Gosu
2011	Red	Nenad Rakočević	Rebol, Scala, Lua
2011	Opa	MLstate	OCaml, Erlang, JavaScript
2011	F*	Microsoft Research	Dafny, F#, Lean, OCaml, Rocq, Standard ML
2012	Elixir	José Valim	Erlang, Ruby, Clojure
2012	Elm	Evan Czaplicki	Haskell, Standard ML, OCaml, F#
2012	TypeScript	Anders Hejlsberg, Microsoft	JavaScript, CoffeeScript
2012	Julia	Jeff Bezanson, Stefan Karpinski, Viral Shah, Alan Edelman, MIT	MATLAB, Lisp, C, Fortran, Mathematica (its Wolfram Language) (strictly its Wolfram Language), Python, Perl, R, Ruby, Lua
2012	P	Vivek Gupta, Ethan Jackson, Shaz Qadeer, Sriram Rajamani, Microsoft	
2012	Ada 2012	ARA and Ada Europe (ISO/IEC 8652:2012)	Ada 2005, ISO/IEC 8652:1995/Amd 1:2007
2013	P4	P4 Language Consortium (P4.org)	
2013	PureScript	Phil Freeman	Haskell
2013	Hopscotch	Hopscotch Technologies	Scratch
2013	Cuneiform	Jörgen Brandt	Swift (the parallel scripting language)
2013	Lean	Microsoft Research	ML, Rocq, Haskell, Agda
2013	Hy	Paul Tagliamonte	Python, Lisp, Clojure
2014	Crystal	Ary Borenszweig, Manas Technology Solutions	Ruby, C, Rust, Go, C#, Python
2014	Hack	Facebook	PHP
2014	Swift	Apple Inc.	Objective-C, Rust, Haskell, Ruby, Python, C#, CLU
2014	C++14	C++ ISO/IEC 14882:2014	C++11, Standard C, C
2014	Solidity	Gavin Wood, Ethereum	JavaScript, C++, Python
2014	COBOL 2014	COBOL ISO/IEC 1989:2002	COBOL
2014	Jai	Jonathan Blow	C, C++
2015	Raku	Larry Wall, The Rakudo Team	Perl, Haskell, Python, Ruby
2015	Pony	Sylvan Clebsch	E
2016	Zig	Andrew Kelley	C, C++, LLVM IR, Go, Rust
2016	Reason	Jordan Walke	JavaScript, OCaml
2016	Gleam	Louis Pilfold, Fly.io	Erlang, Elixir, Elm, Rust, Go, OCaml, JavaScript
2017	C++17		C++14, Standard C, C
2017	AssemblyScript	The AssemblyScript Project	JavaScript, TypeScript, WebAssembly
2017	Ballerina	WSO2, open source	Java, JavaScript, Go, Rust, C#
2017	Q#	Microsoft	C#, F#, Python
2018	C17	ISO/IEC 9899:2018	C11
2018	Fortran 2018	ISO/IEC JTC1/SC22/WG5 N2150:2018	Fortran 2008
2019	Bosque	Mark Marron, Microsoft	JavaScript, TypeScript, ML
2019	V (Vlang)	Alexander Medvednikov	C, Go, Kotlin, Oberon, Python, Rust, Swift
Year	Name	Chief developer, company	Predecessor(s)

== 2020s ==
Year	Name	Chief developer, company	Predecessor(s)
2020	C++20	C++ ISO/IEC 14882:2020	C++17, Standard C, C
2020	ReScript	Bloomberg L.P.	Reason, JavaScript
2021	Microsoft Power Fx	Vijay Mital, Robin Abraham, Shon Katzenberger, Darryl Rubin, Microsoft	Excel formulas
2021	ArkTS	Wang Chenglu, Huawei	TypeScript, Swift, Objective-C, JavaScript, C#, F#, Java, ActionScript, AtScript, AssemblyScript
2022	Carbon (concept)	Google	C++, Rust, Swift, Zig, Kotlin, Haskell
2023	Mojo	Modular	Python, Rust, Cython, C, C++, CUDA, Swift, Zig
2023	Ada 2022	ISO/IEC 8652:2023	Ada 2012 / ISO/IEC 8652:2012
2023	COBOL 2023	ISO/IEC 1989:2023	COBOL 2014 / ISO/IEC 1989:2014
2023	Fortran 2023	ISO/IEC JTC1/SC22 2023	Fortran 2018
2023	Verse	Epic Games	Haskell
2024	C++23	C++ ISO/IEC 14882:2024	C++20, Standard C, C
2024	C23	ISO/IEC 9899:2024	C17
2024	Cangjie	Xinyu Feng, Huawei	ArkTS, TypeScript, JavaScript, Swift, C#, F#, Java, C++, Go, Python
Year	Name	Chief developer, company	Predecessor(s)

== See also ==
- History of computing hardware
- History of programming languages
- Programming language
- Timeline of computing
- Timeline of programming language theory
