= Baba Is You =

2019 puzzle video game

- Developer: Hempuli
- Engine: Multimedia Fusion 2
- Platforms: Linux; macOS; Nintendo Switch; Windows; Android; iOS
- Release: Linux, macOS, Switch, Windows: WW: 13 March, 2019; Android, iOS: WW: 22 June, 2021
- Genre: Puzzle
- Mode: Single-player

Baba Is You is a puzzle video game created by Arvi Teikari (known professionally as Hempuli), a Finnish independent developer. The game centers around the manipulation of rules—represented in the play area by movable tiles with words written on them—in order to allow the player character, usually the titular Baba, to reach a specified goal. Originating as a short demo built for the 2017 Nordic Game Jam, the game was expanded and released on 13 March 2019 for PC and Nintendo Switch. Mobile versions were released in June 2021. A free update titled "Baba Make Level" was released on November 17, 2021, featuring 250 new and previously unused levels and a level editor with online sharing. Baba Is You received generally favorable reviews from critics.

== Gameplay ==
Baba (the white sheep-like creature) is assigned as the player character by the phrase BABA IS YOU. The three blocks reading WALL IS STOP create a rule that prevents Baba from crossing wall tiles. Once the rule blocks are separated, the rule is no longer enforced, and Baba can pass through walls.

In each level, the player is presented with a one-screen puzzle consisting of various objects, characters, and movable word tiles. The player is given control of one or more characters or objects on the screen (most often, the player controls a character named Baba, a white creature). The word tiles consist of nouns corresponding to specific types of objects and obstacles on the field (such as Baba itself, the goal flag, walls and hazards, and other creatures), verbs such as IS and HAS, linking operators such as AND and NOT, and descriptive tiles determining the properties of these objects (such as YOU, which makes all instances of the object become controlled by the player; PUSH and PULL to make them movable; STOP to make them impassable; and WIN to designate the goal object).

When three or more word tiles (minimally consisting of one object, one verb, and one property or object) are aligned vertically or horizontally into a valid syntax, they create a rule that determines how the object behaves and that is enforced until the string is broken up. For example, the goal can be changed by moving IS and WIN blocks to apply to another object, and the player can pass through objects by removing the STOP trait from them. Specific rules for a level may be placed in a way that the tiles cannot be broken up (for instance, by having the rule placed in an inaccessible corner), committing that rule for the entire level. The player completes a level when an object that is the subject of an IS YOU rule (i.e. an active player-character) occupies the same tile as an object that is the subject of an IS WIN rule (i.e. an active goal) or is also given the IS WIN property (i.e. the same object is the player and the goal). Levels are never explicitly failed, but if there are no more IS YOU objects left (or there is no IS YOU rule) the player may be unable to proceed and have to undo or restart. However, it is possible to use certain properties (such as MOVE or SHIFT) that function without IS YOU objects to create a setup where an IS YOU rule is temporarily broken, then re-formed later on.

Objects may usually be transformed through the syntax <object 1> IS <object 2> (e.g. the rule ROCK IS FLAG will immediately replace all rocks on screen with flags). This is prevented through <object 1> IS <object 1> (e.g. ROCK IS ROCK overrides all ROCK IS <object> rules and prevents the aforementioned transformation from occurring.)

The game contains 481 levels, spread across 3 level packs: 231 in "Baba is You", the base game; 88 in "Museum", a collection of unused levels; and 162 in "New Adventures", original content added in the "Baba Make Level" update. At the late-game stages of both "Baba is You" and "Museum", the player gains access to the noun LEVEL, from which point map screens in which levels are selected become levels in and of themselves, with the player transforming levels into objects and manipulating rules around the map screen to progress.

== Development and release ==
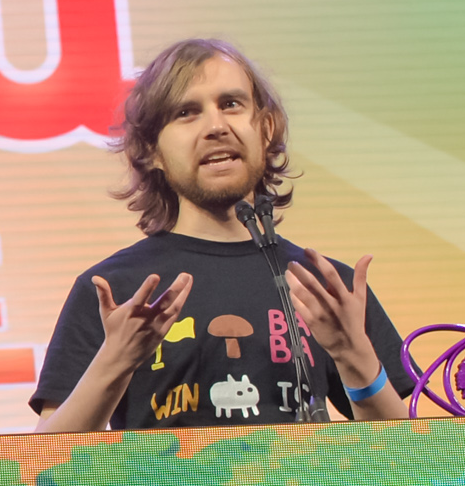
Arvi Teikari accepting his Independent Games Festival Award in 2018

The theme of the 2017 Nordic Game Jam was "Not There", which prompted Teikari, a student at the University of Helsinki who had previously developed the Metroidvania-genre game Environmental Station Alpha, to envision a game concept based on manipulating logic operators. He pictured a block of ice standing next to lava but not melting, protected by the phrase "ICE IS NOT MELT". This sparked the idea of creating a puzzle game where the player would push words to form rules. Initially, each object was supposed to have intrinsic properties (e.g., ice would melt in the presence of lava) that could be disabled using the word "NOT". However, Teikari later concluded that the game would be more interesting if objects had no default properties.

He explained that levels were often created by brainstorming a "cool" or "amusing" solution, and then coming up with how the player would accomplish it. Teikari noted that "the most satisfying moments in puzzle games are those which present the player with simple but hard-to-wrap-your-head-around situations, so that solving the puzzle is about figuring out that one neat trick/twist". As with his previous projects, the game was developed using Multimedia Fusion 2, and a Lua scripting plugin; Teikari credited his friend Lukas Meller for help with the Lua implementations. Teikari wrote on Reddit that the naming of the characters Baba and Keke was inspired by the bouba/kiki effect.

Teikari stated in 2017 that he planned to release the full game in 2018, and placed a development version of the title for download at itch.io. After Baba Is You won at the Independent Games Festival in March 2018, a clone of the game was released by a French publisher on the App Store, using nearly the same graphics and calling itself the same name. Teikari worked with the French division of Apple to remove the offending app.

The game, and a Nintendo Switch release, were focused upon in a Nintendo indie games showcase presentation on 31 August 2018. Baba Is You was released on 13 March 2019, via Steam for Microsoft Windows, Linux, and macOS, and on Nintendo Switch.

A cross-platform level editor, with online level sharing, was added to the game on November 17, 2021, as a free update for the personal computer and Switch versions. This update included 150 additional levels in two new level packs, and added various new rules, art, and soundtracks.

Alongside programming the game, Teikari also composed the soundtrack using OpenMPT. Shortly before the release of the level editor update, he released the music project files via the official Baba Is You Twitter account.

Mobile versions for iOS and Android devices were released on 22 June 2021.

== Reception ==
Reception

Aggregate scores
| Aggregator | Score |
|---|---|
| Metacritic | NS: 84/100; PC: 87/100 |
| OpenCritic | 89% recommend |

Review scores
| Publication | Score |
|---|---|
| Game Informer | 7/10 |
| GameSpot | 7/10 |
| Jeuxvideo.com | 17/20 |
| Nintendo Life | 8/10 |
| Nintendo World Report | 9/10 |
| PC Gamer (US) | 90/100 |
| Pocket Gamer | 4.5/5 |
| TouchArcade | 5/5 |

Baba Is You won first place at the 2017 Nordic Game Jam. It was nominated for the Seumas McNally Grand Prize and won awards for "Best Student Game" and "Excellence In Design" at the 2018 IGF Awards. It was also nominated for "Best Indie Game" at the 2019 Golden Joystick Awards, for "Indie Game of the Year" at the Titanium Awards, and for "Best Independent Game" at The Game Awards 2019. In addition, it was nominated for "Gameplay Design, New IP" at the NAVGTR Awards, for "Game Design" and "Original Property" at the 16th British Academy Games Awards, and for "Best Indie Game" at the Famitsu Dengeki Game Awards 2019. Baba Is You won the award for "Outstanding Achievement in Game Design" during the 23rd Annual D.I.C.E. Awards, as well as for "Best Design" and the "Innovation Award" at the 20th Game Developers Choice Awards. The PC version of the game was among the best-selling new releases of the month on Steam. (Note: Based on total revenue for the first two weeks on sale)

Baba Is You received "generally favorable reviews", according to review aggregator Metacritic. Fellow review aggregator OpenCritic assessed that the game received "mighty" approval, being recommended by 89% of critics. Polygon considered it "one of the best puzzle video games in years", with the reviewer observing that it "asks me to toss my assumptions about how rules in video games work, to analyze how and why they exist in the first place. And that sort of reprogramming of my brain, oddly enough, happens best when the game is turned off". Pocket Gamer was similarly positive, describing it as a "ridiculously complex puzzler that has you questioning not only every decision you make, but how anyone managed to think up something so bizarre", and concluding that it was one of the "most inventive, exciting puzzle games you will ever play. It's beautifully simple in its graphics and its core design, but it'll make your brain hurt with how nonsensical the solutions appear to be".

A criticized aspect of the game is its level of difficulty. Game Informer expressed dissatisfaction with the overcomplication that arises from the compounding of variables in later stages of the game, which often resulted in "exhausting and unsatisfying" gameplay. GameSpot also criticized the increasing difficulty of later puzzles caused by the language of the operating words, saying that "as the language involved gets more complex, words are ushered in whose meaning seems vague and whose purpose remains hazy, and that can make certain puzzles infuriatingly obscure".
