= Sysinfo =

- Original author(s): Nic Wilson
- Developer(s): Tobias Geijersson
- Stable release: 4.3 / September 27, 2019; 5 years ago
- Written in: Assembly language (HiSoft Devpac)
- Operating system: AmigaOS 68k
- Available in: English
- Type: Benchmark
- License: Shareware
- Website: sysinfo.d0.se

Sysinfo is a shareware program written completely in Assembler for the Motorola 68k equipped Amiga computers to benchmark system performance. Sysinfo shows which version of system software is present in ROM, which hardware is present, and which operating mode the hardware uses.

== Sample output ==
SYSINFO V3.22 An Amiga System Information Program Written in Assembler
        Nic Wilson Brisbane Australia. nic AT nicwilson dot com
SYSTEM SOFTWARE INSTALLED   LIBRARIES    INTERNAL HARDWARE MODES
kickstart  (512K)  $00F80000 V37.350   Clock   CLOCK NOT FOUND
utility   CHIP RAM $00000554 V37.3     DMA/Gfx ECS AGNUS - 2Meg
graphics  CHIP RAM $00002A68 V37.41    Mode    NTSC:Hires
keymap    CHIP RAM $00006D68 V37.2     Display ECS DENISE
layers    CHIP RAM $000081D8 V37.9     CPU/MHz 68000   7.16
intuition CHIP RAM $00009984 V37.331   FPU     NONE
dos       CHIP RAM $00011498 V37.45    MMU     N/A
                                       VBR     N/A
SPEED COMPARISONS                      Comment What can I say!
Dhrystones   519   You X               Horiz  KHz 15.72
A600  68000  7MHz 0.98 X               EClock  Hz 715909
B2000 68000  7MHz 0.74 X               Ramsey rev N/A    ICache N/A
A1200 EC020 14MHz 0.42 XX              Gary   rev N/A    DCache N/A
A2500 68020 14MHz 0.25 XXX             Card  Slot YES    IBurst N/A
A3000 68030 25MHz 0.11 XXXXX           Vert    Hz 60     DBurst N/A
A4000 68040 25MHz 0.02 XXXXXXXXXXXXXXX Supply  Hz 60     CBack  N/A
CPU          Mips 0.54
FPU        MFlops  N/A   QUIT   MEMORY BOARDS  ICACHE IBURST CBACK
Chip Speed vs A600 1.00  DRIVES SPEED  PRINT   DCACHE DBURST ALL

SYSINFO V4.0 An Amiga System Information Program Written in Assembler
        Contact address SysInfo@d0.se web page http://sysinfo.d0.se
SYSTEM SOFTWARE INSTALLED   LIBRARIES    INTERNAL HARDWARE MODES
kickstart  (512K)  $00F80000 V37.175   Clock   CLOCK FOUND
utility   CHIP RAM $000007CC V37.3     DMA/Gfx STD AGNUS - 512K
graphics  CHIP RAM $00004258 V37.35    Mode    PAL
keymap    CHIP RAM $00008548 V37.2     Display STD DENISE
layers    CHIP RAM $000099B8 V37.7     CPU/MHz 68000   7.09
intuition CHIP RAM $00009E5C V37.318   FPU     NONE
dos       CHIP RAM $00012470 V37.44    MMU     N/A
                                       VBR     N/A
SPEED COMPARISONS                      Comment What can I say!
Dhrystones   539   You X               Horiz  KHz 15.60
A600  68000  7MHz 1.00 X               EClock  Hz 709379
B2000 68000  7MHz 0.77 X               Ramsey rev N/A    ICache N/A
A1200 EC020 14MHz 0.44 XX              Gary   rev N/A    DCache N/A
A2500 68020 14MHz 0.26 XXX             Card  Slot NO     IBurst N/A
A3000 68030 25MHz 0.11 XXXXX           Vert    Hz 50     DBurst N/A
A4000 68040 25MHz 0.02 XXXXXXXXXXXXXXX Supply  Hz 50     CBack  N/A
Mips   0.56 MFlops N/A    QUIT  MEMORY BOARDS  ICACHE IBURST CBACK
Chip Speed vs A600 1.03  DRIVES SPEED   PRINT  DCACHE DBURST ALL

== Version history ==
- 1990-08-04 v1.4
- 1990-12-17 v1.94
- 1991-01-12 v1.98
- 1991-11-19 v2.51
- 1991-12-11 v2.53
- 1991-12-31 v2.56
- 1991-06-21 v2.22
- 1991-10-25 v2.40
- 1992-03-10 v2.60
- 1992-03-21 v2.62
- 1992-04-12 v2.69
- 1992-09-01 v3.01
- 1993-01-14 v3.11
- 1993-03-27 v3.18
- 1993-11-07 v3.24
- 2012-11-07 v4.0
- 2019-07-13 v4.2
- 2019-09-27 v4.3
- 2020-11-11 v4.4

== See also ==
- SysSpeed
- Dhrystone
- FLOPS
- Kickstart (Amiga)
- Intuition (Amiga)
- AmigaDOS
- Amiga models and variants
- Instructions per second (IPS)
- Amiga Chip RAM
- Amiga custom chips (OCS, ECS, Agnus, Denise, Ramsey, Gary, etc.)
- Motorola 68000 family
