= Valhalla and the Fortress of Eve =

1996 video game

- Developer: Vulcan Software
- Publisher: Vulcan Software
- Designer: Lisa Tunnah
- Programmer: Paul Hale Carrington
- Artist: Paul Hale Carrington
- Writer: Lisa Tunnah
- Platforms: Amiga, Windows, BlackBerry
- Release: 1996
- Genre: Adventure
- Mode: Single-player

Valhalla and the Fortress of Eve, also known as Valhalla 3, is an adventure game developed and released by Vulcan Software in 1995 for the Amiga. It was later ported to PC Windows in 2004 and to the BlackBerry mobile in 2013. It is a sequel to 1994's Valhalla and the Lord of Infinity and 1995's Valhalla: Before the War in which the protagonist King Garamond II has to rescue the kidnapped ladies from an evil witch Eve's castle and find himself a woman of his dreams.

== Gameplay ==
The third game in the Valhalla series abandoned the top-town view for a pseudo-isometric perspective. The control system was also changed, as the mouse became a primary input device.

== Plot ==
The young King Garamond II has conquered his wicked uncle, the Lord of Infinity, and now the kingdom of Valhalla is ruled by its rightful heir. However, when Garamond decides to marry, all the eligible ladies in Valhalla are abducted by Queen Eve, an evil ruler of another kingdom and a devotee of Infinity, and imprisoned in her fortress tower as part of her plan to claim the kingdom of Valhalla as her own. The King begins his quest to free the ladies of Valhalla, one of whom will become his bride, and to make sure Eve would never bother them again.

There are four episodes: The Edge of Eveswood, The Village of Evesland, The Fortress Courtyard, and the Fortress Tower. If the game is completed, Garamond outwits the witch and she is destroyed. He then rescues the ladies of Valhalla, but he falls in love with a peasant girl named Lisa and chooses her as his queen.

== Development ==
Like the previous games in the Valhalla series, Valhalla was written in AMOS BASIC.

== Reception ==
Upon its original release, the game received very mixed reviews. Some were highly positive, including the scores of 88% by Lisa Collins of CU Amiga and 8/10 from Stefan Siemen of Amiga Magazine. Others, however, were more critical, such as Andy Smith of Amiga Format, who awarded it 51%, and Tim Norris of Amiga Power, who gave it only 20%. Herbert Aichinger from Amiga Games gave it mediocre rating of 63%.
