= Valhalla: Before the War =

1995 video game

- Developer: Vulcan Software
- Publisher: Vulcan Software
- Designer: Lisa Tunnah
- Programmer: Paul Hale Carrington
- Artist: Paul Hale Carrington
- Writer: Lisa Tunnah
- Platforms: Amiga, Windows
- Release: 1995
- Genre: Adventure
- Mode: Single player

Valhalla: Before the War is an adventure game developed and published by Vulcan Software for the Amiga in 1995. It is a prequel to the game Valhalla and the Lord of Infinity. The game is known for the in game speech and is the second ever Amiga speech adventure (the first being Lord of Infinity in 1994 and the third was the sequel Valhalla and the Fortress of Eve in 1995). Vulcan Software has later reproduced the games with updated graphics and audio, available for free download in episodic format for the PC Windows.

== Gameplay ==
Progressing in the game involved solving a series of puzzles, with a selling point claiming there to be "thousands of logical puzzles". The Interface was a top down view of the character within rooms inside the castle Valhalla. When the fire button is pressed the player can access icons that have certain actions, these are:

- Map: Represented by an icon of a compass. This function will display a map of the current level
- Look: Represented by an icon of an eye. This function will tell the player character Infinity to inspect the contents of the square directly in front of him and report on it.
- Take: Represented by an icon of an open hand. This function will cause Infinity to take the object in the square in front of him.
- Operate: Represented by the icon of a spanner. This function will cause Infinity to attempt to operate the object in the square in front of him.
- Joystick: Represented by an icon of a joystick. This function will return the game play to the walking mode.
- Disk Access: Represented by an icon of a floppy disk. This function will produce an options screen where the player can choose to restart the level, save the current position to disk and load a saved position.
- Mouth: Represented by an icon of a mouth. This function controls how much Infinity speaks, with two modes.

The player can also access a rucksack that contains items that can be picked up during the game. Using the rucksack is similar to how the main menu operates and has the icons Look, Drop, Insert, Drink, and Joystick to return the player to walking mode. Potions can be drank during certain points in the game which effect Infinity's abilities. Infinity's health is measured in a Stamina indicator. If the indicator reaches the bottom then Infinity will die, stamina top-ups can be found during the levels.

== Plot ==
Set 10 years prior to the events of Valhalla and the Lord of Infinity as the player takes control of the character of Infinity from the first game's mentor. The game is set in a castle named Valhalla which contains many puzzles to solve. Infinity is jealous of his brother, the Good King Garamond as he has taken, in Infinity's opinion Infinity's place as king. Infinity's rage brings him to the decision to destroy his brother so that he will take the place as King.

== Development ==
Before the War used the same game engine as the previous game in the series, and was written in AMOS BASIC.

== Reception ==
The game received mostly poor review ratings (Amiga Format 40%, Amiga Power 19%, The One Amiga 44%, Amiga Computing 45%) in addition to 90% from CU Amiga. Valhalla: Before the War was nevertheless successful enough to warrant another sequel, Valhalla and the Fortress of Eve.

== See also ==
- List of Amiga games
