= Dark Devotion =

2019 video game

- Developer: Hibernian Workshop
- Publisher: The Arcade Crew
- Designer: Louis Denizet
- Programmer: Louis Denizet
- Artist: Alexandre Magnat
- Writer: Arthur Dos Santos
- Composer: Arthur Dos Santos
- Engine: Clickteam Fusion 2.5
- Platforms: Windows; PlayStation 4; Nintendo Switch
- Release: Windows; 25 April 2019; PlayStation 4, Switch; 24 October 2019
- Genre: Action role-playing
- Mode: Single-player

Dark Devotion is a 2019 action role-playing game developed by Hibernian Workshop and published by The Arcade Crew. It was released for Windows, PlayStation 4, Nintendo Switch. Development started in 2015, with a successful Kickstarter campaign being launched two years later.

Dark Devotion follows a Templar Knight initiate who is tasked by her God with exploring a fallen temple. She has to balance her faith and bravery while attempting to clear out the demons inside of it. It received mixed reviews from critics.

== Gameplay ==
The Templar dodges an enemy's attack, then attacks the enemy from behind.

Dark Devotion begins with the Templar Knight entering a temple. She eventually ends up in the Filthblood Shelter. From there, the player can explore dungeons, upgrade their skills, and communicate with non-player characters (NPCs). Shortcuts and portals can be unlocked, allowing faster movement through the game's worlds.

The Templar is able to attack, dodge, parry, and block. Stamina is depleted when the Templar rolls or dodges. Attacking with a weapon also depletes stamina; the amount lost depends on the size of the weapon. Players earn Faith when they kill enemies, allowing them to buy perks. Faith is also used as a form of mana. Perks have five levels, but only one can be used in a level. The player can choose which perk they want to activate in the hub, and can switch them based on the situation or equipment loadout. Tablets can be found in the game's areas, which unlock permanent stat upgrades such as increased stamina or damage. The Templar can become stronger by finding equipment. There are two slots for weapons, one slot for armor, and one for an amulet or an accessory. Armor determines the number of hits the Templar can take before she loses health, and accessories determine the amount of health that the Templar has. The Templar can receive Blessings and Diseases, which provide buffs and debuffs.

Certain types of armor such as heavy armor can provide extra protection at the expense of slower stamina regeneration. Others kinds of armor can provide less protection, but increase the Templar's chance of landing a critical hit. The Templar can encounter bosses through exploration. Some bosses have to be defeated in order to progress in the game. Due to the interconnected nature of the four worlds, the player has access to several different paths. This allows the player to skip certain areas or bosses.

Teleportation Altars can be found around the game's map. Only one altar can be active at a time. In Filthblood, the player can use a one-way portal to return to the last activated altar. If the Templar dies, she loses her equipment, and will respawn in the Filthblood Shelter with low health and armor. Some weapons and armor, like ones dropped by bosses or received as a quest reward, are unlocked permanently. Players can choose to start with one of these from the game's hub. No accessories or runes are retained upon death. In the shelter, the player can use their experience points for upgrades, accept side quests, and collect gear from a blacksmith. The Filthblood Shelter also contains four doors that lead to each of the game's four worlds.

== Development and release ==
Development of Dark Devotion started in 2015. The game had cleared the Steam Greenlight process, and the developers started a Kickstarter campaign seeking €20,000 to fund the game's development. The campaign ended on 17 October, with €31,796 raised. Dark Devotion was announced by The Arcade Crew on 3 April 2018, with a planned release that same year for PC and consoles. A playable demo was featured at PAX East 2018. The game's demo was featured again at E3 2018. Dark Devotion was delayed to Q1 2019 on 17 October 2018. A developer diary was also released that same day, discussing the game's universe, art, and scenario. In January 2019, a trailer was released showing off the game's bosses.

Sources of inspiration include Romantic era artists such as Eugène Delacroix and 14th century French gothic architecture. H. P. Lovecraft's stories and concepts about the antihero helped the developers make improvements to the story arc and character development of Dark Devotion.

Dark Devotion released for Windows on 25 April 2019 and for PlayStation 4 and Nintendo Switch on 24 October 2019. A physical release by Limited Run Games began production in late 2019.

== Reception ==
Reception

Aggregate scores
Aggregator	Score
Metacritic	PC: 72/100 (Note: Score based on 19 reviews.); PS4: 72/100 (Note: Score based on 7 reviews.); NS: 65/100 (Note: Score based on 4 reviews.)
OpenCritic	50% recommend

Review scores
Publication	Score
Famitsu	7/10, 6/10, 7/10, 7/10
RPGamer	4/5
RPG Site	6/10
Screen Rant	4/5
Windows Central	4.5/5

Dark Devotion received "mixed or average" reviews according to review aggregator website Metacritic. Fellow review aggregator OpenCritic assessed that the game received fair approval, being recommended by 50% of critics. It received a score of 27/40 from Famitsu, based on individual reviews of 7, 6, 7, and 7.

Rich Edmonds from Windows Central favorably compared Dark Devotion to the Dark Souls series. He called the visuals "stunning" and the gameplay "incredible". However, Edmonds felt that the music was repetitive and thought that the options were lackluster. Phillip Tinner from Screen Rant described Dark Devotion as an "impressive indie". He believed that the game had issues, but felt that the minor ones could be forgiven due to the size of Hibernian Workshop.

RPG Site's Bryan Vitale called Dark Devotion "beautiful", felt that it sampled too many ideas to make a "cohesive" experience. He believed that the nature of the game's progression hindered the quest design and exploration incentives.

Charalampos Papadimitriou from RPGamer complemented the game's combat mechanics and rogue-lite elements. He praised the game's "immersive" story and world. He felt that some of the systems could have been more developed, and felt that the limited abilities and inventory could restrict a player's options.

=== Nominations ===
List of awards and nominations
Year	Ceremony	Category	Result	Ref.
2018	BitSummit 2018	Vermillion Gate Award	Nominated	
2018	BitSummit 2018	Visual Excellence Award	Nominated	
