= Valhalla and the Lord of Infinity =

1994 video game

- Developer: Vulcan Software
- Release: 1994
- Genre: Adventure

Valhalla and the Lord of Infinity is a 1994 adventure video game by Vulcan Software. It spawned a prequel and a sequel, Valhalla and the Fortress of Eve and Valhalla: Before the War, respectively.

== Gameplay ==
Valhalla is a top-down adventure which uses joystick control. The player explores a series of castle levels, interacting with objects to solve puzzles in order to progress. There are four levels in all.

A particular innovation is the game's use of voice dialogue, particularly of the main character, who has characterful responses when interacting with objects. Valhalla marketed itself as the first ever "speech adventure" on the Amiga platform.

== Plot ==
The player controls the Prince of Valhalla, rightful heir to the kingdom. The game's primary antagonist is the Lord of Infinity, who usurped the throne from the Prince's father following a three-year long civil war. The young Prince was taken into exile. Now that he has come of age, he is tasked with returning to relaim his rightful throne.

== Development ==
Valhalla was programmed over a period of 12 weeks by developers who were newcomers to the industry. Vulcan Software Limited was founded in January 1994 by Lisa Tunnah, who provided writing and design on Valhalla, and Paul Hale Carrington, who worked on the game's graphics and programming. Music was by Private Affair.

The game was written in AMOS BASIC, a newbie-friendly programming language which was better known for amateur projects, and rarely used for commercial games. It was developed on an entry-level Amiga 500. At this time, most Amiga games were written in assembly language for performance reasons, particularly using the SNASM cross-compiler system.

== Critical reception ==
Contemporary review scores for Valhalla varied wildly. Amiga Action rated the game 94%, noting its difficulty but calling it "the most instantly captivating game ever to come into the Amiga Action office/shed." Conversely, Amiga Power rated it 19%, describing the game's propensity for undetectable instant-kill pit traps, a complaint echoed by Amiga Format, who rated it 23%. This sharp disparity in magazine opinions would continue into the game's sequels.

CU Amiga Magazine thought the game was well-presented and well written, rating it 90%. Amiga World gave the game an admiring review, giving it a grade of A and calling it "delightful." They wrote that the four levels were quite immense, yet didn't feel indiscriminate or random in their size.

== Legacy ==
While Valhalla and the Lord of Infinity had been intended as an stand-alone game, its success led Vulcan to produce further games in the series. Valhalla: Before the War (1995) further explored the character of the Lord of Infinity, necessarily a prequel, since the character dies at the end of the first time. Valhalla and the Fortress of Eve (1995) follows the adventures of the Prince (now King Garamond II) and changes the player's view from top-down to a side-on oblique view.

In 1996, Vulcan had a fourth Valhalla game in development, Valhalla and the Charms of King Paul. It was initially announced as the first CD-ROM only in the series, though by July 1997 this was revised to a six floppy disk release. The game would support mouse control, and would have featured a new protagonist, King Paul. Plans were also being made for further releases in the series, which would have seen it reach ten instalments. However, this and further chapters in the Valhalla series would ultimately be cancelled, and King Paul was removed from the Vulcan website's upcoming games page by early 1998.

Due to a decrease in the Amiga's presence as a viable commercial platform after 1994, the three Valhalla games were re-released in "Miniseries" budget format, a smaller box size available by mail order and bulk wholesale. All three appeared in the 1999 compilation CD Vulcanology: The Miniseries Compilation, alongside Vulcan's other Amiga floppy-based titles. Following this, the Valhalla series was re-released for Windows from 2001 to 2003, sold as twelve individual episodes. They games were also released in 2013 for the BlackBerry platform.
