= Flight of the Amazon Queen =

1995 video game

- Developer: Interactive Binary Illusions
- Publisher: Renegade Software
- Designers: John Passfield; Steve Stamatiadis
- Composers: James Hannigan; Richard Joseph
- Engine: JASPAR
- Platforms: Amiga; MS-DOS; iOS; Android
- Release: 1995
- Genre: Adventure
- Mode: Single-player

Flight of the Amazon Queen is a graphical point-and-click adventure game by Interactive Binary Illusions, originally released in 1995 for Amiga and MS-DOS. The game was re-released as freeware in 2004 for use with ScummVM. In January 2022, a sequel was announced, titled Return of the Amazon Queen.

== Development ==
The game was developed on Amiga 500 using AMOS and ported to C for release on MS-DOS. The game engine was called JASPAR: while developers had read about Lucasfilm's SCUMM, the engine was designed in a different way. Deluxe Paint was used for art.

Gameplay is very similar in style to many of LucasArts' popular point-and-click adventures of the 1990s, and was inspired by Monkey Island. The game was inspired by the Indiana Jones film Raiders of the Lost Ark: while the developers knew there was an adventure game of Indiana Jones, at the time it was dismissed as a movie tie-in.

== Plot ==
In 1949, Joe King, pilot for hire and owner of the Amazon Queen airplane which he uses for his work, arrives at a hotel in Rio de Janeiro to transport his next customer, famous film actress Faye Russel, only to be ambushed by his Dutch rival Anderson. Locked in a hotel room and trapped by Anderson's goons, Joe quickly gains assistance from Lola, a showgirl at the hotel and a former love interest, and escapes, making it back to the airport with his mechanic Sparky, just in time to stop his rival taking Faye. Wasting no time, Joe quickly pilots the Amazon Queen towards the location of Faye's shoot, only for a storm to cause him to crash-land in the Amazon jungle. After getting Faye and Sparky to safety, Joe begins searching for help, soon encountering a parrot named Wedgewood with a message for help. Seeking out the person the message was for, Joe meets with Trader Bob, a merchant who lives amongst an indigenous tribe in the jungle, who soon asks for his help in rescuing a princess named Azura from Floda, a lederhosen company that Bob suspects is a cover for something much more sinister.

Joe quickly begins searching for the jungle, encountering an entire tribe of Amazon women who capture him and took in Faye when she decided to seek help herself. Released by the tribe, Joe agrees to help them rescue Azura as well. Finding the princess within a hidden base beneath Floda, Joe frees her and returns to her tribe, only to find himself coming face-to-face with Floda's leader—Dr. Frank Ironstein, a mad scientist who seeks to conquer the world by turning Amazon women into dinosaur warriors through the use of his DinoRay invention. Seeing that Joe was smart to get around his security, Ironstein coerces him into helping him find an artifact from a temple that he requires known as the Crystal Skull, threatening to harm Azura if he does not. Left with no choice, Joe agrees, and heads for the temple, navigating traps and puzzles and eventually finding what he needs. Returning it to Ironstein, Joe quickly finds himself betrayed and trapped in Floda's base, but soon escapes and goes after Ironstein with the help of Anderson, his former rival having originally been hired by the scientist to assist but later deciding to turn against him. Heading into the valley, Joe assists in trying to find Ironstein and manages to stop him, saving the day, before taking the scientist's Zeppelin and flying into the sunset with Azura.

== Releases ==
Prior to release, the game was sent by the publisher to Future Publishing's Amiga Power magazine, to be reviewed by Jonathan Nash in issue 51. Whilst playing he found an error which prevented progression through the game (at the start, the bellhop would not relinquish the door key). He informed the publisher which resulted in the game release being delayed for several months as, at the time, the game had been sent to the disk duplication factory ready for reproduction. As it was also too late to change the magazine content and layout, the issue went to press with an apology that they had unintentionally reviewed an "unfinished" game, which was against one of their policies. The screenshots for the issue came from the PC version, also against their policy. The front cover of this issue featured an artist's impression of the 'escape from Rio' car chase scene.

The Amiga version has no voices, whereas the MS-DOS CD version is a talkie with full voice-acting. The voice of the Temple Guardian was provided by British actress Penelope Keith. Actor William Hootkins, who played Red Six (Jek Porkins) in Star Wars, also voiced a number of characters.

The MS-DOS CD version contains a minigame of sorts. The file Queen.1 (1.82MB, CRC-32: D72DCD56) is found in the INTERVIE folder in the CD-ROM's Root. The minigame is a fully playable adventure game, where the main character tries to get an interview from the game's development team.

In March 2004, the game was released as freeware, and support for it was added to ScummVM, allowing it to be played on Linux, Mac OS X, Windows, and many other operating systems and consoles. The datafiles for both the floppy disk and CD-ROM version are available from the ScummVM website. The Fedora RPM software repository has an installer for the game alongside ScummVM. This game is directly included in the Debian software repository.

In 2009, iPhSoft took ScummVM's FOTAQ iPhone / iPod Touch free port and modified it. This modification has been commercially sold on iTunes but was discontinued in mid-2015 due to lack of iOS 8 and up support.

In 2013, the game was released at GOG.com as a digital download ready to play on modern PCs.

In March 2016, MojoTouch, working with John Passfield, the designer of the original game, released the 20th Anniversary Edition on the App Store (iOS), Google Play and Amazon Appstore. This version includes improved graphics rendering, full voice acting, new touch interface, auto-save, multi-language support, high definition menus and the following bonus material: Making of Flight of the Amazon Queen booklet, a play through of the interactive interview minigame with audio commentary by John Passfield, the original game manuals (both US and international versions) and the Official Playing Guide.

On 14 May 2024 it was released on Sega Dreamcast by World of Games Publishing.

== Reception ==
Reception

Aggregate score
Aggregator	Score
GameRankings	72.50% (iOS); 75.00%

Review scores
Publication	Score
Adventure Gamers	3.5/5
Pocket Gamer	7/10 (iOS)
Slide to Play	3/4 (iOS)

Discussing the game's commercial performance, designer John Passfield said in 2013: "I believe it sold fewer than 100,000 copies, which at the time was okay".

Flight of the Amazon Queen received generally positive reviews from critics. At GameRankings the iOS version scores 72.50% and the PC version 75.00%. Pocket Gamer's Spanner Spencer called the iPhone release of Flight of the Amazon Queen more of a direct conversion than an adaptation, but was generally positive for this version.
