= Platypus (video game) =

2002 video game

- Developer: Squashy Software (Note: Ported to mobile devices by BitRabbit, PSP by MumboJumbo, Xbox 360 by Escapist Games)
- Publisher: Idigicon (Note: Windows version was published digitally by Retro64 and KISS Ltd., mobile ports were published by Handmark, PSP port was published by MumboJumbo, Xbox 360 port was published by Escapist Games)
- Producer: George Bray
- Designer: Anthony Flack
- Programmer: Michael W. Boeh
- Composers: Alistair Bowness; Chris Abbott; Sam Izzard
- Series: Platypus
- Platform: Windows: BlackBerry, iOS, Windows Mobile, OS X, Palm OS, PlayStation Portable, Symbian, Xbox 360
- Release: 2002: Windows; UK: May 14, 2002; WW: January 25, 2004 (digital); WW: August 15, 2014 (Steam) OS X; WW: May 9, 2006 PSP; WW: November 14, 2006; WW: March 26, 2009 (PSN) Windows Phone/Palm OS; WW: April 16, 2008 BlackBerry/Symbian; WW: September 24, 2008 iOS; WW: December 8, 2008 Xbox 360; WW: November 23, 2009
- Genre: Horizontally scrolling shooter
- Modes: Single-player, multiplayer

Platypus is a horizontal scrolling shooter game created, designed and programmed by Anthony Flack, produced by George Bray, with additional programming by Michael W. Boeh. The objective is to guide an antique spacecraft by utilizing the mouse in order to avoid and attempt to shoot enemies.

== Gameplay ==
A screenshot of the Windows version

The player flies an antiquated spacecraft (the last of the fictional F-27 Platypus fleet) and attempts to defend the peaceful country of Mungola from neighboring Colossatropolis, which has become so overcrowded that its inhabitants are taking over Mungola for space and resources. The game consists of four levels, with five areas per level and a strong boss enemy that must be defeated at the end of the fifth area. The player can collect power-ups that affect the type and firing rate of the ship's weapons, equip auxiliary cannons, or double the point values of all enemies and items.

Points are scored for destroying enemies and collecting bonus coins and fruits. In addition, at the end of each area, the player receives bonus points depending on the percentage of primary targets and enemy craft destroyed. One life is lost whenever the player's ship collides with a target or is hit by enemy fire.

At the beginning of the game, the player is given a set number of credits that can be used to continue play if all lives are lost. One bonus credit is awarded for completing each of the first three levels; after the fourth is completed, the player receives a large bonus depending on the number of unused credits.

== Production ==
All the artwork for the game was created using a process called claymation. Flack has stated that due to limited availability of plasticine in his local area (at the time the game was created), he re-used the same lump of grey clay to create all the models, photographed them with a digital camera, and coloured the images in Adobe Photoshop. The music in Platypus on all platforms (except for the iPhone port) consists of various remixes of Commodore 64 game tunes by various composers, and created by several artists. They originally appeared on CDs from the C64Audio.com label, and were licensed to Idigicon Ltd. by High Technology Publishing Ltd., the current publishers for all composers whose music appeared in the game except Jonathan Dunn who is represented by Bucks Music Publishing Ltd. and who at the time was unpublished. Where possible, full credits appeared in the distributions, albeit in text file form.

As of 2019, Anthony and Claymatic Games bought the license for Platypus, including its sequel.

== Releases ==
Platypus was first released on CD in May 2002. It was modified and distributed online by Retro64 from January 2004 and included an easy mode and mouse support. A third build of the game (which can be distinguished as the score of Player 2 as yellow numbers and not red) included various bug fixes and was used for multiple localizations, including Chinese and Japanese versions. On November 14, 2006, Platypus saw a release for Sony's PlayStation Portable console. On March 26, 2009, it became available for download on the PlayStation Network. The game functions the same as its full PC downloadable version, but with minor changes for the PSP version, like the new screen size. On November 24, 2009, Platypus was released on Xbox Live Indie Games. On August 15, 2014, Platypus and Platypus II, were both released on Steam.

== Reception ==
The PSP version received mixed or average reviews, according to Metacritic.

Reception (original)

Aggregate score
Aggregator	Score
Metacritic	(PSP) 59/100

Review scores
Publication	Score
GameSpot	(Win) 8.0/10 (PSP) 6.8/10
GameSpy	(PSP) 3.5/5
IGN	(PSP) 5.0/10
Pocket Gamer	(iOS) 3.5/5
X-Play	(PSP) 2/5
Clubic	(OS X) 3/5
Extreme Gamer	(PSP) 6/10
Game Tunnel	(Win) 8/10
Kidzworld	(PSP) 4/5
MacLife	(iOS) 4/5
Slide To Play	(iOS) 3/4

== Sequel ==
In February 2007, Idigicon released Platypus II, developed by Citric Games without the involvement of the original developer.

== Platypus Reclayed ==
After purchasing the rights from Idigicon, a remake called "Platypus Reclayed" began development with Flack returning as the lead designer, working alongside the Claymatic Games team. A demo was released for PC on June 9, 2025, as part of the Steam Next Fest. The game was released on September 18, 2025. According to Metacritic, the game received "generally favorable" reviews (85 Metascore).

The game features "full high definition artwork physically rebuilt from scratch, a glorious Retro64 chiptunes soundtrack, and full modding support. With multiple game modes, official mods including a 4:3 as-is remake of the original Platypus, as well as single and 2 player co-op support." It is available on PC, Nintendo Switch, Playstation 4/5, Xbox One/Series X|S.
