= François Lionet =

French computer programmer

- Born: 6 July 1963
- Education: École nationale vétérinaire de Lyon
- Occupation: Programmer
- Website: auteurlogiciels.over-blog.com

François Lionet is a French programmer, best known for having written STOS BASIC on the Atari ST and AMOS BASIC on the Amiga (along with Constantin Sotiropoulos). He has also written several games on these platforms.

In 1994, he founded Clickteam with Yves Lamoureux, producing the Klik series of games-creation tools, including Multimedia Fusion.

== Software ==
- 2023 AOZ Studio 1 ·
- 2019 AMOS 2 project (vaporware)
- 2013 Clickteam Fusion 2.5
- 2006 The Games Factory 2.0
- 2006 Multimedia Fusion 2.0
- 2002 Multimedia Fusion 1.5
- 1999 Jamagic
- 1997-98 Multimedia Fusion 1.0
- 1996-97 The Games Factory 1.0
- 1995-96 Corel Click & Create
- 1993-94 Klik & Play
- 1993 AMOSPro Compiler
- 1992 AMOS Professional
- 1992 Easy AMOS
- 1991 AMOS Compiler
- 1990 AMOS BASIC
- 1989 STOS Compiler
- 1988 STOS BASIC
- 1987 Captain Blood (PC and C64)
- 1983-86 Various 8-bit games
