= STOS BASIC =

Dialect of the BASIC programming language

- Loading screen
- Developer: François Lionet, Constantin Sotiropoulos
- First appeared: 1988; 38 years ago

Influenced by
- BASIC

Influenced
- AMOS

STOS BASIC is a dialect of the BASIC programming language for the Atari ST personal computer. It was designed for creating games, but the set of high-level graphics and sound commands it offers is suitable for developing multimedia software without knowledge of the internals of the Atari ST.

STOS BASIC was developed by Jawx–François Lionet, and Constantin Sotiropoulos–and published by Mandarin Software (now known as Europress Software).

== History ==
Although the first version of STOS to be released in the UK (version 2.3) was released in late 1988 by Mandarin Software, a version had been released earlier in France.

Version 2.3 was bundled with three complete games (Orbit, Zoltar and Bullet Train), and many accessories and utilities (such as sprite and music editors). Initially implemented as a BASIC interpreter, a compiler was soon released that enabled the user to compile the STOS Basic program into an executable file that ran a lot faster because it was compiled rather than interpreted. In order to be compatible with the compiler, STOS needed to be upgraded to version 2.4 (which came with the compiler). STOS 2.4 also fixed a few bugs and had faster floating point mathematics code, but the floating point numbers had a smaller range.

STOS 2.5 was released to make STOS run on Atari STEs with TOS 1.06 (1.6), and then STOS 2.6 was needed to make STOS run on Atari STEs with TOS 1.62. STOS 2.7 was a compiler-only upgrade that made programs with the STOS tracker extension (used to play MOD music) compile.

There was a 3rd-party hack called STOS 2.07 designed to make STOS run on even more TOS versions, and behave on the Atari Falcon.

Around 2001 François Lionet released via the Clickteam website the source code of STOS BASIC.

On the 4th of April, 2019 François Lionet announced the release of AMOS2 on his website Amos2.tech. AMOS2 replaces STOS and AMOS together, using JavaScript as its code interpreter, making the new development system independent and generally deployed in web browsers.

AMOS2 is now known as AOZ Studio.

== Extensions ==
It was possible to extend the functionality of STOS by adding extensions which added more commands to the language and increased the functionality. The first such extension to be released was STOS Maestro which added the ability to play sampled sounds. STOS Maestro plus was STOS Maestro bundled with a sound-sampler cartridge. Other extensions included TOME, STOS 3D, STE extension, Misty, The Missing Link, Control extension, Extra and Ninja Tracker. These extensions kept STOS alive for many years after its release.

== Criticisms ==
While giving programmers the ability to rapidly create a game without knowing the internals, STOS was criticised for being slow (especially when intensively using the non-high-level commands), and for not allowing the user to program in a structured manner.

== Other platforms ==
In 1990, AMOS BASIC was released for the Amiga. It was originally meant to shortly follow the release of STOS on the Atari ST. AMOS was released about two years after the UK release of STOS. But this turned out to be a blessing in disguise for the Amiga community thanks to the extra development time. Not only did AMOS take advantage of the extra Amiga hardware and have more commands than STOS, but the style of BASIC was completely different - it had no line-numbers, and there were many structured programming constructs (at one time, the STOS Club Newsletter published a program that allowed the reader to program STOS using that style). While it was often possible to directly convert STOS BASIC programs that did not heavily rely on extensions to AMOS BASIC, the reverse was not usually true.

A version for IBM PC compatibles called PCOS was once mentioned, but that never materialised. Instead, the publishers Mandarin Software renamed themselves Europress Software. One of the developers in Jawx, Francois Lionet, was later to form Clickteam with Yves Lamoureux and went on to release the Klik (click) series of games-creation tools (which were dissimilar to STOS as they use a primarily mouse-driven interface without the need for traditional code). Klik & Play, The Games Factory, Multimedia Fusion and Multimedia Fusion 2 have been released in this series.
