= Kateryna Yushchenko (scientist) =

Ukrainian Soviet and Ukrainian computer scientist

- Катерина Логвинівна Ющенко
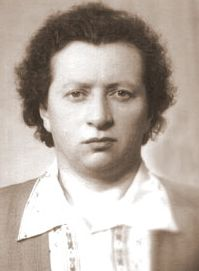
- Yushchenko in 1960
- Born: Kateryna Lohvynivna Rvacheva; 8 December 1919; Chyhyryn, Ukrainian People's Republic
- Died: 15 August 2001 (aged 81)
- Education: Central Asian State University
- Scientific career
- Fields: Computer science
- Workplaces: Ukrainian SSR Academy of Sciences

Kateryna Lohvynivna Yushchenko (Ukrainian: Катерина Логвинівна Ющенко; Russian: Екатерина Логвиновна Ющенко, romanized: Yekaterina Logvinovna Yushchenko; 8 December 1919 – 15 August 2001) was a Ukrainian computer and information research scientist, corresponding member of USSR Academy of Sciences (1976), and member of The International Academy of Computer Science. She developed one of the world's first high-level languages with indirect address in programming (Pointers are analogous to this addressing), called the Address programming language. Over the period of her academic career, Yushchenko supervised 47 Ph.D. students. Further professional achievements include Yushchenko being awarded two USSR State Prizes, The USSR Council of Ministers Prize, The Academician Glushkov Prize, and The Order of Princess Olga. Yushchenko was the first woman in the USSR to become a Doctor of Physical and Mathematical Sciences in programming.

== Biography ==
Kateryna Lohvynivna Yushchenko (née Rvacheva) was born in 1919 in Chyhyryn, central Ukraine. She started her undergraduate studies in Kyiv University in 1937, and during the Second World War she attended the Central Asian State University in Tashkent, graduating in 1942. After the war she returned to Ukraine and in 1950, under the direction of Boris Gnedenko, she obtained a Ph.D. from the Institute of Mathematics of the Ukrainian Academy of Sciences. For a period of seven years, Yushchenko held the position of Senior Researcher of the Kiev Institute of Mathematics of the Ukrainian SSR Academy of Sciences (1950–57). In 1954, the Levedev Laboratory (where the first computer in continental Europe MESM was created) was transferred to the Institute of Mathematics. Yushchenko was a member of the joint group of scholars operating the MESM. In 1957 she became Director of the Institute of Computer Science of the Ukrainian SSR Academy of Sciences. During her forty years service to the institute, Yushchenko created an internationally notable scientific school of theoretical programming.

=== Scientific contributions ===
Yushchenko is best known for her creation of Address programming language, the first fundamental advancement in the scientific school of theoretical programming. This language provided the free location of a program in computer memory.

In the process of working with MESM, it became clear that the more complex tasks were difficult to solve by writing simple machine programs. There was a need to develop a high-level programming language, but there was a problem: the absence of an appropriate translator for better human/computer communication. L.I. Kaluzhnin, a professor at Kyiv University, who taught a course on mathematical logic in the 1950–1970s, made a significant advancement in the understanding of this problem and formalized a scheme of interfacing with the program. Following this development, in 1955, Yushchenko developed a programming language based on two general principles for the computer work: addressing and software management. Creating a convenient system of concepts for describing the computer architecture and its system instructions, the language thus became the means of manipulation of the second-rank addresses (Pointers) and higher ranks. Address programming language became the first fundamental achievement of the Soviet School of Theoretical Programming.

Yushchenko was the founder of the first Soviet School of Theoretical Programming. During the 1970s–1980s, theoretical programming became a subject of research of its own. One of the major achievements of the School at that time was the creation of algebraic grammar methods for software synthesis.

In the 1990s, the efforts of the School of Theoretical Programming were concentrated on the study of algebraic grammar-methods of knowledge representation model of computation, and friendly user interface for designing and developing databases and knowledge bases for decision support systems, expert systems and methods of learning for them.

After forty years of research, theoretical programming enriched with its own formal-algorithmic apparatus and the subject of research, significantly expanded from procedural languages to methods of knowledge representation that form artificial intelligence tools for developers of application systems.

== Work ==
Yushchenko worked on probability theory, algorithmic languages and programming languages, and developing methods of automated data processing systems.

To prepare programmers, Yushchenko wrote an educational series of textbooks in the 1970s. Yushchenko held five Copyright Certificates, which developed eight State Standards of Ukraine. She is an author of over 200 manuscripts, including 23 monographs and train aids. Part of these works have two to-three editions, and have been translated to more than 5 languages internationally, including German, Czech, Hungarian, French, Danish and so on.

=== Books ===
- Glushkov V.M., & Yushchenko E.L., D 1966, The Kiev Computer; a Mathematical Description, USA, Ohio, Translation Division, Foreign Technology Div., Wright-Pattenon AFB, 234p., ASIN: B0007G3QGC.
- Gnedenko B.V., Koroliouk V. S. & Iouchtchenko E.L., D 1969, Eléments de programmation sur ordinateurs, Paris, Dunod, 362p., ASIN: B0014UQTU0, viewed 24 October 2021,

<https://files.infoua.net/yushchenko/Elements-de-programmation-sur-ordinateurs_BGnedenko-VKoroliouk-EIouchtchenko_1969_France_OCR.pdf>.

- Gnedenko B.V., Koroljuk V.S. & Justschenko E.L., D 1964, Elemente der Programmierung, DDR, Leipzig, Verlag: B. G. Teubner, 327 oldal.
- Gnedenko B.V., Korolyuk V.S. & Juscsenko E.L. D 1964, Bevezetѐs a progamozásba, – I, II. – Magyarország, Budapest, Uj technica.
- Вычислительная машина «Киев»: математическое описание / В. М. Глушков, Е. Л. Ющенко. — К. : Техн. лит., 1962. — 183 с.
- Кулинкович А.Е., Ющенко Е.Л., О базовом алгоритмическом языке. / Кулинкович А.Е., Ющенко Е.Л., в журн.: «Кибернетика», К. : No. 2, 1965. C.3-9, – URL: https://files.infoua.net/yushchenko/O-bazovom-algoritmicheskov-yazyke_AKulinkovich_EYushchenko_1965.pdf
- Ющенко Е. Л. Адресное программирование / Е. Л. Ющенко. — К. : Техн. лит., 1963. — 286 с. https://files.infoua.net/yushchenko/Adresnoe-programmirovanie_EYushchenko_1963.pdf
- Ющенко Е. Л. Программирующая программа с входным адресным языком для машины Урал −1 / Е. Л. Ющенко, Т. А. Гринченко. — К. : Наук. думка, 1964. — 107 с.
- Ющенко Е.Л., Адресный язык (Тема 5) // Кибернетика на транспорте: Заочный семинар. / Киевский дом Научно-технической пропаганды / – К. : – 1962. – 32 с., – URL: Kibernetika-na-transporte_Adresnyy-yazyk_KYushchenko_1962.pdf (infoua.net)
- Управляющая машина широкого назначения «Дніпро» и программирующая программа в ней / Е. Л. Ющенко, Б. Н. Малиновский, Г. А. Полищук, Э. К. Ядренко, А. И. Никитин. — К. : Наук. думка, 1964. — 280 с.
