= Super Skidmarks =

1995 video game

- Developer: Acid Software
- Publishers: Acid Software; Guildhall Leisure; Codemasters
- Platforms: Amiga, Amiga CD32, Mega Drive
- Release: 1995
- Genre: Racing

Super Skidmarks is a racing video game developed by Acid Software and released in 1995. The game is the sequel to Skidmarks and as such was also termed Skidmarks 2 and Super Skidmarks 2 by commentators. The game features "minimally realistic" action viewed from an isometric perspective as well as novelty vehicles such as wheeled cows and caravans. Various methods such as joypad adapters and link systems are employed to allow multiple players to compete, up to a maximum of 8. The game was critically acclaimed and a best-seller in the UK. Several upgrades to the Amiga original were released as well as conversions for the Amiga CD32 and Sega Mega Drive, the latter published by Codemasters.

== Development ==
Super Skidmarks was developed by New Zealand-based Acid Software, predominantly designed and written by Chris Blackbourn. The game is the sequel to Skidmarks and was originally intended as an expanded version containing new tracks and a track editor before being developed into a full sequel (though the final game featured no track editor). The first game suffered from problems with disk accessing and crashes which were fixed for Super Skidmarks, partly through the ability to install the game on a hard drive. The game includes twice the number of tracks as in the original as well as an increased number of vehicles and competitions and a more difficult single-player mode. The artificial intelligence was made to be more intelligent and realistic. Skidmarks has a two-player split screen mode while the sequel allows a three-way split screen or four players to play using a whole screen in a mode inspired by Micro Machines. Players can use multiple joysticks rather than share a keyboard. Another additional feature is the ability to attach a caravan to the player's vehicle, dramatically affecting the handling. A Mega Drive conversion was published by Codemasters.

== Reception ==
Amiga Power said that the widescreen link mode, which allows up to 8 players simultaneously, "elevates the game to near divine status" though pointed out that only a small minority of players who owned two A1200s could experience the feature and gave the A1200 version a higher score. The game went on to be ranked the 24th best game of all time in the magazine.

Amiga Computing praised the variety of humorous vehicles such as cows, caravans, Volkswagens and Minis. The magazine wrote that the graphics were simple but enjoyable, but felt the menus could have benefited from a more functional user-interface. It concluded: "This is one of the most playable and fun race-em-ups around with the vast amount of new features added it's certainly worth a look". Amiga Format called the game "nigh on perfect" and "a completely social sport" which "couldn't be realised through any medium other than a computer". It felt the game was best when played by multiple people and said: "Do yourself a favour, buy this game". CU Amiga called the wheeled cows "tremendous fun" but complained of a difficult learning curve. On balance the magazine felt Super Skidmarks was "one of the best games I've ever played, certainly the best so far this year". ACAR said: "Super Skidmarks is where it's at in fun to play, thoroughly unrealistic race games. Brilliant fun." The game was a best-seller in the UK.
