= Environmental Station Alpha =

2015 video game

- Official ESA Steam artwork
- Developer: Hempuli Oy
- Publisher: Hempuli Oy
- Designer: Arvi Teikari
- Composer: Roope Mäkinen
- Engine: Multimedia Fusion 2
- Platforms: Microsoft Windows; OS X; Linux
- Release: WW: April 22, 2015
- Genre: Metroidvania
- Mode: Single-player

Environmental Station Alpha is a 2015 Metroidvania created by Finnish independent developer Arvi Teikari (known professionally as Hempuli).

== Gameplay ==
The player character is a robot who must examine a vast bio-dome space station which was mysteriously abandoned, despite still holding signs of life.

The player explores the vast side-scrolling maze of the space station, consisting of several large areas. At the beginning of the game, many areas are inaccessible, so the player must acquire items that grant the robot new abilities (like a grappling hook, the ability to double jump, etc.), and then backtrack to previous areas to find previously-inaccessible paths leading deeper into the station.

== Reception ==
Jed Whitaker of Destructoid scored the game 7/10 and said, "[o]verall, Environmental Station Alpha didn't reinvent the wheel when it comes to Metroidvania games, but it certainly helped satisfy my appetite." He praised the game's pixel art aesthetic and bosses, writing that "[t]hese confrontations are some of the most satisfying boss battles I've had in a game in some time"; however, he was less enthusiastic toward the game's mandatory backtracking to find new pathways, which he said could be either "rewarding, or tedious depending on the amount of time needed." John Walker of Rock Paper Shotgun also gave the game a positive review, calling it a "Metroid-alike pixel platformer that I've thoroughly enjoyed, right up until I didn't any more. And yet, I find myself recommending it." He said that "[t]he fine balance of Metroid games is often underestimated by those wishing to emulate them, but Arvi Teikari and Roope Mäkinen demonstrate a rare skill of precision" but wrote that the game was too difficult for his tastes, labelling its later sections as "fiddly and over-complicated."

A speedrunning community has developed for Environmental Station Alpha, with the game having been run at the speedrunning marathons European Speedrunner Assembly and Games Done Quick multiple times apiece.
