= Address programming language =

Early high-level programming language

The Address programming language (Russian: Адресный язык программирования, Ukrainian: Адресна мова програмування) is one of the world's first high-level programming languages. It was created in 1955 by Kateryna Yushchenko. In particular, the Address programming language made possible indirect addressing and addresses of the highest rank – analogous to pointers.

Unlike Fortran and ALGOL 60, APL (Address Programming Language) supported indirect addressing and addressing of higher ranks. Indirect addressing is a mechanism that appeared in other programming languages much later (1964 – in PL/1).

The Address language was implemented on all the computers of the first and second generation produced in the Soviet Union. The Address language influenced the architecture of the Kyiv, M-20, Dnipro, Ural, Promin and Minsk computers. The Address programming language was used for the solution of problems in areas including aviation, space exploration, machine building, and military complex – in particular, to calculate the trajectories of ballistic missiles in flight – in the 1950–60s. Implementations of the Address programming language were used for nearly 20 years. A book about APL was published in Ukraine in 1963 and it was translated and published in France in 1974.

The Address language affected not only the Soviet Union's and other socialist countries economical development, but information technology and programming worldwide. APL's proposed and implemented ideas and tools can be found in many programming-related fields, such as abstract data types, object-oriented programming, functional programming, logical programming, databases and artificial intelligence.

== Books ==
- Glushkov V.M., & Yushchenko E.L., D 1966, The Kiev Computer; a Mathematical Description, USA, Ohio, Translation Division, Foreign Technology Div., Wright-Pattenon AFB, 234p., ASIN: B0007G3QGC.
- Gnedenko B.V., Koroliouk V. S. & Iouchtchenko E.L., D 1969, Eléments de programmation sur ordinateurs, Paris, Dunod, 362p., ASIN: B0014UQTU0, viewed 24 October 2021, URL: https://files.infoua.net/yushchenko/Elements-de-programmation-sur-ordinateurs_BGnedenko-VKoroliouk-EIouchtchenko_1969_France_OCR.pdf.
- Gnedenko B.V., Koroljuk V.S. & Justschenko E.L., D 1964, Elemente der Programmierung, DDR, Leipzig, Verlag: B. G. Teubner, 327 oldal.
- Gnedenko B.V., Korolyuk V.S. & Juscsenko E.L. D 1964, Bevezetѐs a progamozásba, – I, II. – Magyarország, Budapest, Uj technica.
- Вычислительная машина «Киев»: математическое описание / В. М. Глушков, Е. Л. Ющенко. — К. : Техн. лит., 1962. — 183 с.
- Кулинкович А.Е., Ющенко Е.Л., О базовом алгоритмическом языке. / Кулинкович А.Е., Ющенко Е.Л., в журн.: «Кибернетика», К. : No. 2, 1965. C.3–9, – URL: https://files.infoua.net/yushchenko/O-bazovom-algoritmicheskov-yazyke_AKulinkovich_EYushchenko_1965.pdf
- Ющенко Е. Л. Адресное программирование / Е. Л. Ющенко. — К. : Техн. лит., 1963. — 286 с. https://files.infoua.net/yushchenko/Adresnoe-programmirovanie_EYushchenko_1963.pdf
- Ющенко Е. Л. Программирующая программа с входным адресным языком для машины Урал −1 / Е. Л. Ющенко, Т. А. Гринченко. — К. : Наук. думка, 1964. — 107 с.
- Ющенко Е.Л., Адресный язык (Тема 5) // Кибернетика на транспорте: Заочный семинар. / Киевский дом Научно-технической пропаганды / – К. : – 1962. – 32 с., – URL: Kibernetika-na-transporte_Adresnyy-yazyk_KYushchenko_1962.pdf (infoua.net)
- Управляющая машина широкого назначения «Дніпро» и программирующая программа в ней / Е. Л. Ющенко, Б. Н. Малиновский, Г. А. Полищук, Э. К. Ядренко, А. И. Никитин. — К. : Наук. думка, 1964. — 280 с.
