= Constantin Sotiropoulos =

French computer programmer

Constantin Sotiropoulos is the co-creator (with François Lionet) of AMOS BASIC, a popular video game and multimedia programming language for the Amiga computer, and STOS BASIC on the Atari ST. He has also been creator of copy protection software for some French companies.

Before joining the 16-bit scene, he also developed Speedy Wonder (BASIC compiler) on the Amstrad and Thomson 8-bit micro-computers, released by French company Minipuce, and ML1, a macro-assembler for the same machines (released by Micro-Application). Both software were co-developed with Youri Beltchenko.
