= Clickteam =

French software development company

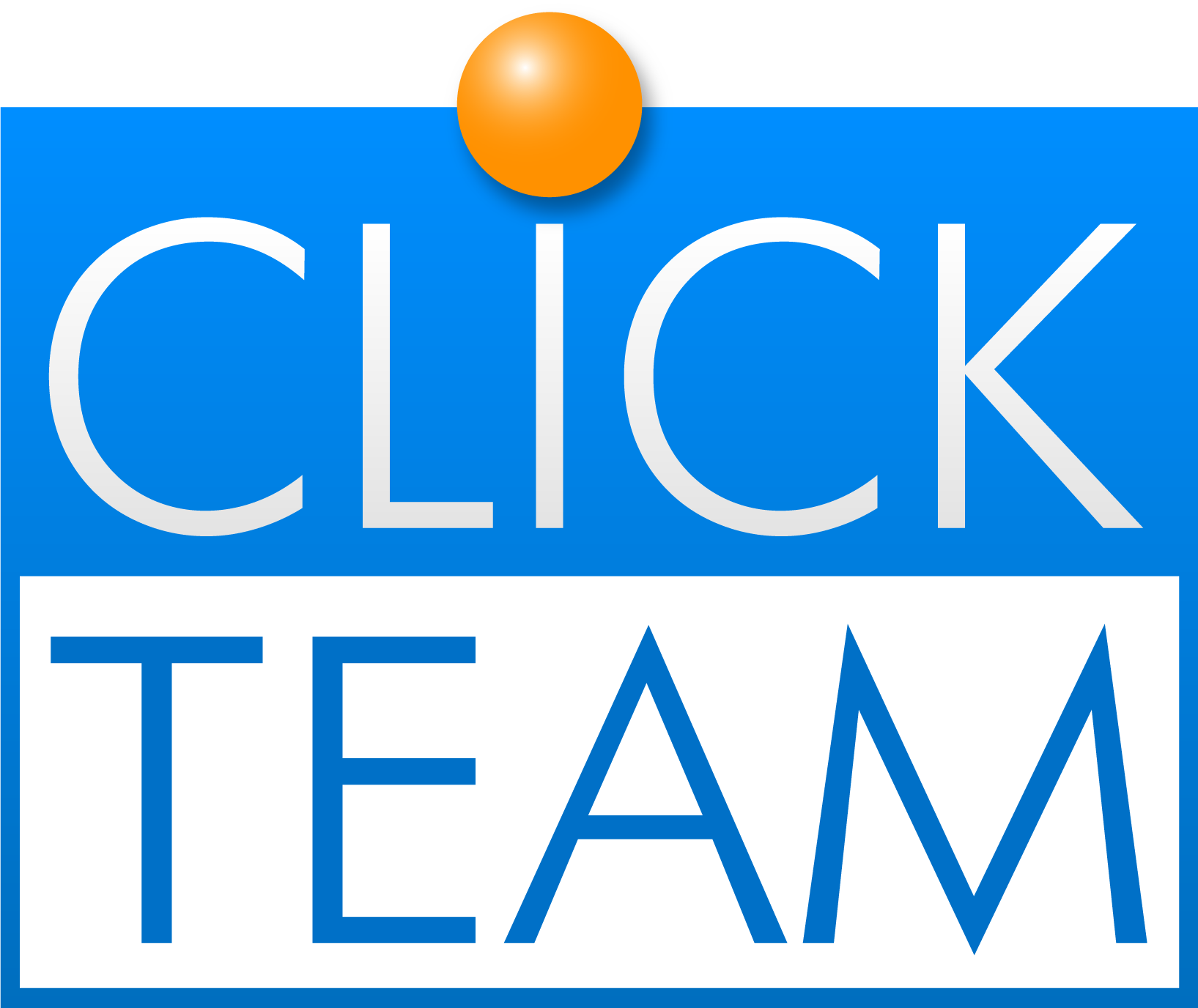
- Type: Private
- Industry: Software industry
- Founders: Francis Poulain; François Lionet; Yves Lamoureux
- Headquarters: Boulogne-Billancourt, France
- Key people: Yves Lamoureux
- Products: Clickteam Fusion
- Website: clickteam.com

Clickteam is a French software development company based in Boulogne-Billancourt, Hauts-de-Seine. Founded by Francis Poulain, François Lionet and Yves Lamoureux, Clickteam is best known for the creation of Clickteam Fusion, a script-free programming tool that allows users to create video games or other interactive software using a highly advanced event system.

== History ==
Before founding Clickteam, François Lionet was the programmer of STOS BASIC, a programming language released in 1989 for the Atari ST, and AMOS BASIC, a more advanced language released in 1990 for the Commodore Amiga. Both of these have since been released in open-source form on the Clickteam organisation website. Yves Lamoureux was also a successful game developer prior to co-founding Clickteam, working with multiple companies on games.

Clickteam's debut software was Klik & Play, released in 1994 as commercial, proprietary software. A version for educational use, dubbed Klik & Play For Schools, was also released as freeware, to be used exclusively for school activities. Its name gave rise to the term "Klik", which is often used to collectively refer to the company's entire line of creation software.

The Event Editor in Klik & Play on Windows 3.1, where game logic was created using a visual grid of conditions and actions instead of traditional code

The primary workflow of the software is designed around a user-friendly, drag-and-drop interface where creators visually place objects and assets onto a stage, referred to as a "frame." From there, game logic and behaviors are defined not through traditional, text-based code, but within the software's signature feature: the Event Editor. This pioneering interface presents programming logic as a spreadsheet-like grid, forming a powerful visual programming system.

Within this grid, users create "if-then" style rules to control the application. For instance, a developer might create a rule by selecting a "Player" object, choosing a condition from a list such as "Collision with another object," and specifying an "Enemy" object. They would then assign a corresponding action from another list, like "Destroy the Player object." This methodology makes the software immediately accessible to those with no prior programming experience. This event-based system became the foundational and defining feature of most subsequent Clickteam products.

Following the success of Klik & Play, the product line evolved throughout the 1990s with successors like The Games Factory, Click and Create and Multimedia Fusion which iteratively added more power and removed earlier limitations. During this period, the company also experimented with other development paradigms, such as the scripted 3D game engine Jamagic. The mid-2000s saw the release of Multimedia Fusion 2, which represented a foundational change with its completely rewritten engine, designed to accommodate more sophisticated projects and enable multi-platform support. This was succeeded in 2013 by the current flagship product, Clickteam Fusion 2.5, which featured a significantly upgraded rendering engine and broader platform support.

Clickteam Fusion 3, the next major iteration of the software, is currently in development. The company has been documenting its progress through public development blogs, indicating that the new version is being built on a completely new core engine with cross-platform compatibility as a primary focus.

== Products ==
=== Clickteam Fusion 2.5 ===
Clickteam Fusion 2.5
- Release: Build 280 / December 2013; 12 years ago
- Stable release: Build 296 / December 25, 2025; 8 months ago
- Operating system: Microsoft Windows, macOS
- Type: Game creation system
- Website: www.clickteam.com/clickteam-fusion-2-5

Clickteam Fusion 2.5 was released in 2013 as the successor to Multimedia Fusion 2. While not a complete rewrite like its predecessor, it introduced a significant number of new features and modernized the editor. A major enhancement was the full integration of hardware acceleration (using DirectX and OpenGL), which dramatically improved the performance of games and applications. Runtime export modules for Clickteam Fusion 2.5 are available for Adobe Flash, iOS, XNA, Android, HTML5, UWP and MacOS.

In September 2016, Clickteam partnered with the Humble Bundle and offered a Fusion 2.5 centered bundle. Around ten games and Fusion 2.5 with various export modules were offered in the "Clickteam Fusion 2.5 Bundle". Notably, for several games the source code was included.

In 2019, Clickteam released a new DLC for Clickteam Fusion 2.5, named Clickteam Fusion 2.5+. It introduced new features such as child events, which only run if their parent events are true, support for DirectX 11, new output window in the debugger, a profiler, and more. The aim of Clickteam Fusion 2.5+ was to make it easier to manage and organize large projects, as well as to improve performance of games created with the software.

=== Multimedia Fusion 2 ===
Multimedia Fusion 2
- Release: Build 239 / June 30, 2006; 20 years ago
- Final release: Build 257 / 2013; 13 years ago
- Operating system: Microsoft Windows
- Successor: Clickteam Fusion 2.5
- Type: Game creation system
- Website: www.clickteam.com/multimedia-fusion-2

Multimedia Fusion 2 was a major update to the Clickteam line of software, released in 2006. It was a complete rewrite of the original engine and editor, introducing a modern interface and significantly enhanced functionality. MMF2 continued to use the trademark event editor but offered a much more powerful and optimized runtime, allowing for the creation of larger and more complex games and applications.

Key improvements included a fully integrated physics engine (Box2D), alpha channel support for true transparency, a new debugger, and a more streamlined development environment. MMF2 also expanded its export capabilities, allowing users to create applications for various platforms through optional exporter modules, including Flash, XNA (for Windows Phone and Xbox 360), and iOS. It was offered in several editions, including a "Developer" version that granted royalty-free commercial distribution rights.

=== The Games Factory 2 ===
The Games Factory 2
- Release: Build 239 / June 30, 2006; 20 years ago
- Final release: Build 257 / 2013; 13 years ago
- Operating system: Microsoft Windows
- Successor: Clickteam Fusion 2.5
- Type: Game creation system
- Website: www.clickteam.com/the-games-factory-2

The Games Factory 2 was the successor to the original The Games Factory, released by Clickteam in 2006 as a budget-friendly, entry-level game creation tool. It was essentially a feature-limited version of the more powerful Multimedia Fusion 2.

The Games Factory 2: Newgrounds Edition was a special freeware version released in 2010, created through a partnership between Clickteam and the popular online content portal Newgrounds.

=== Jamagic ===
Jamagic
- Release: 2001; 25 years ago
- Final release: Build #27 / February 18, 2003; 23 years ago
- Operating system: Microsoft Windows
- Type: Game creation system

Jamagic was a 2001 software development environment by Clickteam designed for creating 2D and 3D games and applications. A departure from the main "Klik" line, Jamagic used a proprietary scripting language similar to C++/JavaScript. The product was ultimately discontinued due to a lack of market adoption.

=== Multimedia Fusion ===
Multimedia Fusion
- Release: 1.00 Build 87 / June 1998; 28 years ago
- Final release: 1.5 Build 119 / March 2005; 21 years ago
- Operating system: Microsoft Windows
- Successor: Multimedia Fusion 2
- Type: Game creation system

Multimedia Fusion (MMF) was developed by Clickteam and published worldwide by IMSI Corporation in 1998. It was originally developed under the named Click & Create 2. Positioned as a powerful successor to Click and Create, it was designed to move beyond the scope of simple game creation and function as a comprehensive tool for developing complex, data-driven games and interactive multimedia applications.

The software was built upon the same core principles as its predecessors, utilizing the user-friendly drag-and-drop interface and the visual event editor. However, it removed many of the hard-coded limitations that had defined earlier versions, allowing for more objects, larger application sizes, and greater overall complexity.

Released in December 2001, Multimedia Fusion 1.5 was a commercial upgrade that introduced significant enhancements to the software's core architecture. Key among these was a great expansion of the number of Alterable Values available to objects, improving their data-handling capabilities The Special object was also updated with native fast-looping functions, a feature previously reliant on third-party extensions. Additionally, the update integrated powerful new objects like Direct Show for video playback and the Sub-Application object for nesting projects. This version also marked a technological shift by discontinuing support for creating 16-bit applications.

Released in 2002, the Multimedia Fusion Pro License was a paid legal agreement that allowed developers to sell applications made with Multimedia Fusion without the mandatory "Fueled by Fusion" logo and copyright notice. This provided a fully royalty-free and unbranded distribution option aimed at professional users.

A key feature of MMF was its Software Development Kit (SDK), which allowed developers to create custom objects and features for the software. A community of developers quickly formed around creating and sharing these extensions, which added functionalities far beyond the scope of the base software. These included everything from advanced networking protocols (like TCP/IP) and database connectivity to new graphical effects and complex mathematical operations. This extensibility made it a highly versatile and long-lasting product.

=== Click and Create ===
Click and Create
- Release: v1.00 / May 31, 1996; 30 years ago
- Final release: v1.06 / February 8, 2000; 26 years ago
- Operating system: Microsoft Windows
- Successor: Multimedia Fusion
- Type: Game creation system

Click and Create (often abbreviated as CnC, or C&C) is a game creation tool developed by Clickteam and first published in 1996 by Corel. It was originally announced under the name Klik and Create and offered more advanced features that its predecessor lacked, such as the ability to create scrolling games and a timeline editor. The software's focus was deliberately broadened beyond the scope of simple game creation. Additionally, it was the first version to include a SDK, allowing for the creation of third-party extensions. It was marketed as a more versatile tool for general multimedia authoring. This shift was reflected within the software itself, which consistently referred to user projects as "applications" rather than "games."

In 1999 the distribution rights were handed to IMSI and the program was renamed Multimedia Fusion Express to match the naming scheme of the then recently released Multimedia Fusion.

=== The Games Factory ===
The Games Factory
- Release: v1.00 / 1996; 30 years ago
- Final release: v1.06 / February 8, 2000; 26 years ago
- Operating system: Microsoft Windows
- Successor: Multimedia Fusion, The Games Factory 2
- Type: Game creation system

The Games Factory is a 1996 game creation tool developed by Clickteam and published by Empire Interactive and Europress. It was the successor to Klik & Play and was released as a sister product to the more advanced Click & Create. TGF was designed to be a budget-friendly entry point for first-time game designers, allowing them to create arcade, platform, and adventure games without any knowledge of traditional programming languages. It was available in both 16-bit and 32-bit versions to support Windows 3.1 and Windows 95, respectively.

=== Klik & Play ===
Klik & Play
- Developers: Francois Lionet and Yves Lamoureux
- Release: v1.00 / October 20, 1994; 31 years ago
- Final release: v1.02 / January 18, 1996; 30 years ago
- Operating system: Microsoft Windows, Classic Mac OS
- Successor: The Games Factory, Click & Create
- Type: Game creation system

Klik & Play (often abbreviated as KnP) is a 1994 game creation software tool developed by François Lionet and Yves Lamoureux at Europress Software. It was published by several companies in different regions, including Maxis in the United States, Europress in the UK, Ubisoft in France, and Fujitsu in Japan.

Klik & Play was designed to allow users to create simple games using a drag-and-drop interface and a basic event editor. It was designed for accessibility, requiring no prior programming experience. While limited (e.g., no native scrolling), it established the core design philosophy for all subsequent Clickteam products.

The software was initially a commercial product for Windows 3.1 and MacOS, available on both 3.5" floppy disks and CD-ROM. A freeware version for educational institutions, titled "Klik & Play For Schools" was also released.

=== Other products ===
Install Creator
Install Creator (originally released as Install Maker) is a Windows utility released by Clickteam in the late 1990s for creating software installers. It uses a visual wizard interface, allowing developers to build self-extracting setup files without needing to write script code. The tool packages application files, uninstallation data, and license agreements into a single executable for the end-user. It is distributed in a free version, which includes a mandatory advertisement for Clickteam products, and a paid professional version.
Patch Maker
Patch Maker is a utility released in the late 1990s designed to create update packages for existing software. The program compares the binary data of an older file version against a newer one to identify specific changes. It then generates a compact patch file that updates the installed software by modifying only the changed data, rather than requiring a full reinstallation.
SynchronX
SynchronX was a file synchronization utility developed by Clickteam in the late 1990s. The software is designed to compare directory structures between local and remote locations, ensuring that file contents are identical across both sources.
Vitalize!
Vitalize! is a discontinued web browser plugin (ActiveX and NPAPI) that allowed applications created with Clickteam's software to be executed within a web browser window. Released in 1998, the plugin served as an alternative to Adobe Flash Player, Adobe Shockwave Player and Java for web-based gaming. The plugin saw several iterations, with Vitalize! 4 being the final major release. Support for the plugin ended in 2012 as Clickteam focused into exporters for common plugins like Flash and removed from Fusion 2.5 in favor of HTML5 standards and Flash exporters.

== Usage and community ==
=== Games made with Clickteam tools ===
Some of the most notable games made using Clickteam's software are:

- Various Five Nights at Freddy's titles, including:
  - Five Nights at Freddy's (2014)
  - Five Nights at Freddy's 2 (2014)
  - Five Nights at Freddy's 3 (2015)
  - Five Nights at Freddy's 4 (2015)
  - Five Nights at Freddy's: Sister Location (2016)
  - Freddy Fazbear's Pizzeria Simulator (2017)
  - Ultimate Custom Night (2018)
- Mr. Hopp's Playhouse 2 (2021)
- Baba Is You (2019) – made in Multimedia Fusion 2
- Mr. Hopp's Playhouse (2019)
- Spark the Electric Jester (2017)
- Trap Adventure 2 (2016) – made in Clickteam Fusion 2.5
- The Escapists (2015) - early versions, further development was continued on Unity
- Environmental Station Alpha (2015)
- Freedom Planet (2014)
- Angry Video Game Nerd Adventures (2013)
- The Sea Will Claim Everything (2012) - made in Clickteam Fusion Developer 2.5 by Jonas Kyratzes
- I Wanna Be the Guy (2007) – made in Multimedia Fusion 2
- Knytt (2006) and Knytt Stories (2007) - Made in Multimedia Fusion
- The Spirit Engine (2003) and The Spirit Engine 2 (2008) - Made in Multimedia Fusion
- Eternal Daughter (2002) - Made in Multimedia Fusion
- Destruction Carnival (1997) - Made in Klik & Play.

=== Fan community ===
Several online communities have emerged around Clickteam's development tools, providing platforms for developers to share games, resources, and technical knowledge. Among the first prominent community websites was Silky's Klik & Play page, founded by Pat Jennings in 1995. The site became a popular early repository for user-created games, particularly after being featured by Europress. Jennings also established an accompanying discussion board called "The Wall," where community members gathered to discuss game creation and related topics.

The Daily Click, launched in 2002 by users Chrisd and Rikus, operates as one of the longest-running community portals and game databases for Clickteam developers, where creators can submit their work with descriptions and download links. The site has hosted official competitions in partnership with Clickteam, with software licenses offered as prizes. The platform includes user rating systems, maintains developer profiles for community members, and provides news, game showcases, and articles related to game development.

Kliktopia is an archival project dedicated to the digital preservation of games and applications created with Clickteam's software tools. Established in 2018 by Josh "Joshtek" Dowen, the archive maintains over 4,000 games with downloadable files and screenshots for each entry. The project preserves freeware hobbyist games dating back to 1994, many of which were originally hosted on personal websites and file hosting platforms that are no longer accessible. Creators typically promoted their games through community platforms that catalogued releases but did not provide direct hosting. Clickteam has officially endorsed the project, allowing it to host official demo games alongside community-created content. The archive continues to expand through community submissions and active recovery efforts from defunct websites and personal collections.

== Bibliography ==
- Углев С. (2018). Конструктор игр Clickteam Fusion. Litres. ISBN 9785041229450.
- Darby, Jason (2006). Make amazing games in minutes (1st ed.). Charles River Media. ISBN 1584504072.
