= AMOS (programming language) =

Programming language

- Paradigm: Imperative, Procedural
- Developer: François Lionet and Constantin Sotiropoulos
- First appeared: 1990; 36 years ago
- Final release: AMOS Professional 2.0 / 1993
- Typing discipline: Static
- OS: AmigaOS
- License: BSD style license
- Filename extensions: .amos
- Website: AMOS Professional Official; AMOS and STOS

Dialects
- AMOS, Easy AMOS, AMOS Professional

Influenced by
- STOS BASIC

AMOS BASIC is a dialect of the BASIC programming language for the Amiga computer. Following on from the successful STOS BASIC for the Atari ST, AMOS BASIC was written for the Amiga by François Lionet with Constantin Sotiropoulos and published by Europress Software in 1990.

The release of the original AMOS product was followed by AMOS Compiler, which effectively transformed it from an interpreted to a compiled language, the beginner-focused Easy AMOS, and the more feature-rich AMOS Professional. Some years after Europress' departure from the Amiga platform in 1994, AMOS was released as open source.

The language was notable for its focus on media and game development capabilities, and its relative ease of use compared to other Amiga programming languages. It featured full structured code and numerous high-level functions for loading and manipulating images, animations, and sounds. These features made it popular among hobbyists, particularly beginners, although it saw some use in the field of commercial game development, including the Valhalla and the Lord of Infinity adventure series.

== Design ==
AMOS is a BASIC interpreter for the Commodore Amiga platform. The core product consists of an integrated development environment featuring a code editor with an autocomplete function. The program can be run directly from the editor, and lines of code can also be entered and run in direct mode. Data banks can be loaded with elements such as sound or audio, which are saved along with the program.

AMOS distinguishes itself from earlier BASIC interpreters in several ways. It features built-in commands for handling the Amiga's hardware features, particularly its graphics and sound systems. Line numbers are not required, with GOTO commands typically targeting user-defined labels. It can also load and run sections of 68000 assembly code as part of the program.

To simplify animation of sprites, AMOS includes the AMOS Animation Language (AMAL), a compiled sprite scripting language which runs independently of the main AMOS BASIC program. It is also possible to control screen and "rainbow" effects using AMAL scripts. AMAL scripts in effect create CopperLists, small routines executed by the Amiga's Agnus chip.

One of AMOS BASIC's disadvantages is its lack of support for the Amiga's operating system functions and interfaces, making it unsuitable for writing desktop applications or utility software. Instead, it controls the Amiga hardware directly, an approach commonly used by Amiga games at the time. As a result, programs written in AMOS have a non-standard user interface, and can encounter compatibility problems with newer versions of hardware.

Another disadvantage is that, as a high-level interpreted language, AMOS programs are typically not as fast as those written in pure assembly language.

AMOS programs can be run independently of the IDE using standalone runtime interpreter called RAMOS. Compilers were also published for AMOS, which turn AMOS into standlone executables, removing the need for an interpreter and improving execution speed.

== History ==
=== Development and initial release ===
AMOS drew inspiration from the François Lionet's previous product, STOS BASIC for Atari ST. Mandarin Software originally expected a straight port to Amiga. However, very little code from STOS was used, only some routines for strings and evaluations.

Development on an Amiga version began in April 1989, but hit a delay on 19 March 1990, when Lionet was conscripted into the French army for one year. Despite this, he was able to continue work on the project in secret. AMOS was written in 68000 assembly language using HiSoft Devpac, an assembler for Amiga.

An early advertisement for the product appeared in the December 1989 issue of English-language magazine Amiga Computing, which subtitled it "The Game Creator". Previews appeared in the May 1990 issue of the magazine.

The main build of AMOS v1.1 was completed on 12 June 1990, followed by the manual and Extras disk in August. It was published by Mandarin Software for £49.95, or US$75.

=== Further developments ===
In September 1990, the AMOS V1.21 update was released as a freely distributable package, following user feedback. The French version of AMOS was released in March 1991 at the end of Lionet's military service. The 1.2 release added a third Data Disk and introduced routines for bank swapping and sprite flipping. This would be followed by AMOS 1.2.3, which added the Serial extension, sprite compactor, and procedure locking feature.

Initially, AMOS was exclusively an interpreted language, which imposed performance limitations over established Amiga programming languages like 68000 assembly language and C (programming language). Development on a compiler for AMOS begain in September 1990, and was released as an additional product in June 1991, alongside the AMOS V1.3 update. Changes in 1.3 included graphics optimizations written by Gary Symons.

In July, following the release of 3D graphics extension AMOS-3D, Lionet began work on a beginner-friendly variant of AMOS titled Easy AMOS, which was completed in February 1992. Concurrently, a version 1.34 update for the original AMOS was released on 3 February 1992, fixing several bugs amid a code rewrite. Easy AMOS was published on 23 April 1992 by Europress. Easy AMOS featured tutorial mode and additional features, but lacked certain features from the original.

In March 1992, development began on an enhanced version, named AMOS Professional. It was published in Autumn 1992, bringing new features, including innovations from Easy AMOS. However, it lacked compatibility with AMOS Compiler. Around August 1993, this was resolved with the release of AMOS Professional Compiler, which included a free 2.0 update for AMOS Professional. It sold for £34.99 at launch.

The last update to the original AMOS and Compiler would be V1.36, released on 1 February 1993, which improved compatibility with AGA Amigas. Further updates to AMOS Professional were reported to be in development which would add AGA support, although this would ultimately occur, and AMOS Professional V2.00 was ultimately the last first-party AMOS release.

AMOS competed on the Amiga platform with Acid Software's Blitz BASIC, which grew in popularity following its version 2 release in 1993. Blitz had a reputation for superior game performance and additional suitability for writing GUI-based utility software, while AMOS was considered easier to use.

=== Discontinuation ===
In 1994, Europress and François Lionet quietly discontinued support for the product line, moving on to PC development. They would subsequently release game creator tool Klik & Play for Microsoft Windows later that year. By 1995, Europress no longer sold AMOS Professional Compiler, and the product was no longer stocked by UK distributors.

Despite this, AMOS remained popular in the Amiga community in the amateur and low-budget game development scene. A temporary distribution deal for AMOS Professional and its Compiler would be arranged late in 1995 with budget publisher F1 Licenseware, who also sold a third-party extension adding AGA support.

In 1998, development of AMOS Professional was passed to community coordinator Pietro Ghizzoni, who announced plans to release an updated V3 of the product. Planned features included bug fixes, new extensions, standard Amiga OS library and GUI system support, and AGA support. However, the product ultimately never materialized.

In 2000, the source code to AMOS, AMOS Compiler, and Easy AMOS' were released under a BSD style license by Clickteam, publishers of Klik & Play. AMOS Professional and its compiler were not included in this release, but on 1 December 2012 the source code was released to public. On 26 April 2020, an official release was made under the MIT License, covering both the source code and the official build.

=== Further developments ===
In 2019, François Lionet announced AMOS 2, a port of the language to modern operating systems. It was scheduled to be completed in 2019, to be followed by a more elaborate language called GAMOS, an object-oriented language based on BASIC which would support 3D graphics features. In 2020, AMOS 2 became AOZ Studio, launching version 1 in 2022, where it was used in educational settings. In September 2024, AOZ Studio AI was announced.

== Products ==
=== AMOS the Creator ===
The original AMOS BASIC, also called AMOS the Creator, was released in 1990.

AMOS software could be distributed using a runtime-only interpreter tool called RAMOS, allowing standalone AMOS programs to be run by any Amiga user without requiring them to own a copy of AMOS. This would be superseded in June 1991 by AMOS Compiler, a program which pre-compiles the code to executable. This typically results in performance gains and helps to obfuscate the original AMOS source code.

=== Easy AMOS ===
Easy AMOS was released in 1992 for the price of £34.99, or £15.00 for existing AMOS users. It was intended to meet the needs of users who were interested in AMOS' reputation as an easy language to make games, but had no previous programming knowledge.

It introduced the Tutor, an interactive tutorial mode for learners. It also added some new language features, such as new support for tracker music, and improved the appearance of the user interface. It included a large and easier to read manual, several example programs, and new accessories such as a new graphics editor.

However, Easy AMOS suffered from some limitations. In an effort to simplify the package, it omitted several features or commands, including hardware sprites, Icon-based tiles, AMAL, copper bars, Menus, and the disk font system. Many pre-existing AMOS programs did not function under Easy AMOS.

It also lacked compatibility with either RAMOS or AMOS Compiler, limiting the ability to publish standalone software, although the subsequent AMOS Professional Compiler would support Easy AMOS. Additionally, the AMOS PD Library Disk 400 later included Easy RAMOS, which would run Easy AMOS independently with small adjustments.

=== AMOS Professional ===
An improved version of AMOS titled AMOS Professional was released in 1992. Improvements include a better integrated development environment, ARexx support, a new user interface API and new flow control constructs. Some features from Easy AMOS were carried through, including tracker support and online help; in general, it was capable of loading software from both AMOS and Easy AMOS. It also supported IFF animation playback and the MED music format.

AMOS Professional was not compatible with the AMOS Compiler, a situation which would be resolved with the release of AMOS Professional Compiler in 1993. AMOS Professional Compiler was also backwardly compatible with original AMOS and Easy AMOS.

== Reception ==
AMOS reportedly sold well in the UK and Europe, but not in the United States. Sales estimates suggest 75,000 copies of AMOS the Creator, 50,000 copies of AMOS Professional, 35,000 copies of AMOS Compiler, and 25,000 copies each of Easy AMOS and AMOS Professional Compiler. Many hundreds of thousands more copies were distributed for free on coverdisks of various Amiga magazines between 1993 and 1995.

AMOS received a great deal of coverage in Amiga magazines, including tutorial article series, while third-party support ranged from commercial extensions to fan-made disk magazines such as Totally AMOS, Nothing But AMOS, the Mr. AMOS Club, and Amoszine. Some commercial games were produced with the language, but for performance reasons most commercial Amiga games were instead written with 68000 assembly language tools such as HiSoft Devpac or SNASM.

The initial release of AMOS the Creator was highly regarded in magazine reviews. Amiga Format praised the language's way of abstracting away technical implementation details like double buffering, saving the developer's time and attention for game mechanics. Its speed was rated favourably compared to other BASIC dialects at the time, and suitable for commercial game development. CU Amiga noted the advantage of BASIC, which many hobbyists were already familiar with from earlier 8-bit microcomputers like ZX Spectrum.

Easy AMOS was rated 92% by Amiga Format, noting its beginner-friendliness and improved accessories.

AMOS Professional was well-regarded. Amiga Shopper devoted four pages to a review, praising the improved editor UI, new accessories, new manual, ARexx support, debugger, over 200 new instructions, although criticized the lack of support for the ECS and AGA chipset features, rating it 4/5. Europress' own magazine Amiga Action rated it 93%, focusing on improvements like unlimited undo/redo, support for blank lines in programs, machine code procedures.

AMOS Professional Compiler was rated 8/10 by both Amiga Shopper and Amiga Computing. Criticisms included bugs with the Squash feature, double-precision maths, and the Unpack command behaviour when the compiler removes the default screen. CU Amiga rated it 88%, saying "If you own AMOS, then you'd be a fool to miss out on the AMOS Pro Compiler". Amiga Format scored it 90% with similar opinion. The German-language Amiga Magazin rated it 8.2/12, praising it aside from a few minor bugs and lack of German documentation.

== Software written using AMOS ==
- AQUABYSS by Aged Code, is a 2022 strategy trading game for the Amiga
- Miggybyte disk magazine
- Scorched Tanks
- Games by Vulcan Software, most notably the Valhalla trilogy
- Amiga version of Ultimate Domain (called Genesia) by Microïds
- Flight of the Amazon Queen, by Interactive Binary Illusions
- Extreme Violence, included on an Amiga Power cover disk
- Jetstrike, a commercial game by Rasputin Software
- Black Dawn, a 1993 game for the Amiga personal computer
