= HiSoft Systems =

Software companies of the United Kingdom

- Industry: Software
- Founded: 1980
- Founder: David Link
- Headquarters: Dunstable, Bedfordshire,
- Products: Devpac

HiSoft Systems is a software company based in the UK, creators of a range of programming tools for microcomputers in 1980s and 1990s.

== Products ==
Their first products were Pascal and assembler implementations for the NASCOM 1 and 2 kit-based computers, followed by Pascal and C for ZX Spectrum computers, as well as a BASIC compiler for this platform and a C compiler for CP/M. While compilers for the ZX Spectrum were typical products for this platform, with integrated editor, compiler and runtime environment fitting in RAM together with program's source, the C compiler for CP/M was typical for this operating system, batch operated, with separate compilation and linking stages.

Their most well-known products were the Devpac assembler IDE environments (earlier known as GenST and GenAm for the Atari ST and Amiga, respectively). The Devpac IDE was a full editor/assembler/debugger environment written entirely in 68k assembler and was a favourite tool among programmers on the Atari GEM platform.

HiSoft also sold HiSoft BASIC and Power BASIC, HiSoft C Interpreter for the Amiga, Atari ST, Aztec C, Personal Pascal, Forth-83 and FTL Modula-2. They also produced WERCS, the WIMP Environment Resource Construction Set.

The only game published by HiSoft was ProFlight for Atari ST (1990) and Amiga (1991).

== Background ==
The business was created in 1980 and was based in Dunstable, Bedfordshire before relocating to the village of Greenfield in the same county.
