= Leon Zervos =

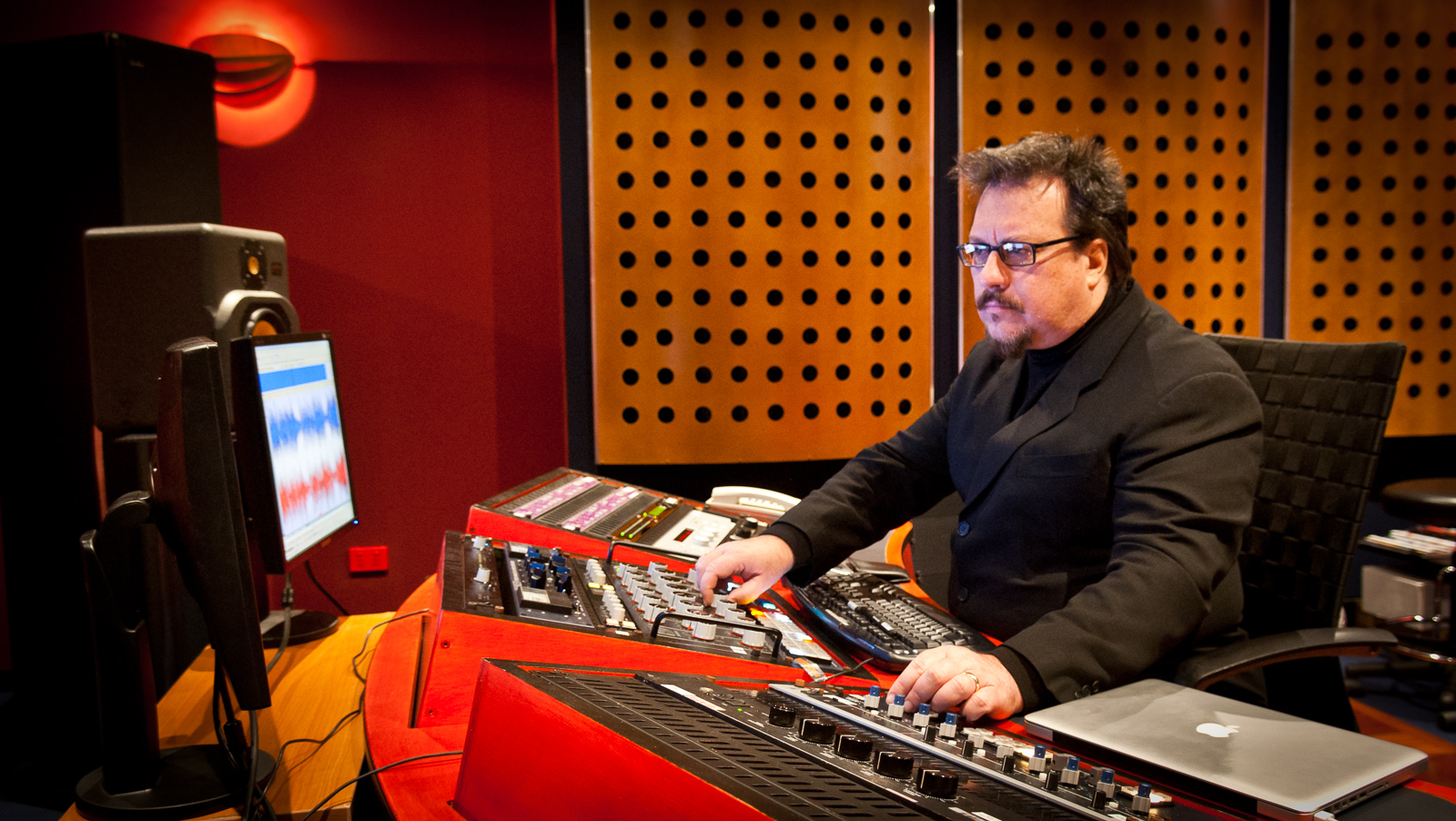
- Leon Zervos at Studios 301

Background information
- Genres: Rock, Folk, Hard Rock, Pop, Dance, Country, R&B, Orchestra
- Occupation: Mastering Engineer
- Website: http://www.studios301.com

Leon Zervos is a mastering engineer who has worked with artists including Pink, Rihanna, Maroon 5, Beastie Boys, and Willie Nelson.

== Life and career ==
Leon Zervos began his mastering career in 1982 at the then EMI Studios 301 in Sydney, where he worked with the likes of INXS, Crowded House, and Midnight Oil. Moving to New York City in 1992, he worked mastering for Absolute Audio for six years, before taking on the role of Senior mastering engineer at Masterdisk in 1993, where he added artists such as Aerosmith, Mobb Deep, Maroon 5, Avril Lavigne, Gavin DeGraw, Duran Duran, Ben Folds and NSYNC to his mastering portfolio, with some of the music he mastered going on to win GRAMMY Awards. Zervos left Masterdisk in 2003, becoming senior mastering engineer at Sterling Sound in New York City, until 2009 when he returned to Sydney.

Leon Zervos currently works as a mastering engineer at Studios 301 in Sydney, Australia. He works with a wide variety of genres, including pop, jazz, country, metal, R&B, dance, and orchestral, boasting Platinum selling credits in each category.

== Credits ==
Leon Zervos is credited as the Mastering engineer on each of the following recordings

Year	Song/Album	Artist	Year	Song/Album	Artist
1985	"Go West (Crazy Spinning Circles)" single	The Cult	1985	Down on the Farm EP	Cosmic Psychos
1985	Speak & Spell album	Depeche Mode	1985	"Living in a Dream" single	Pseudo Echo
1986	Wa Wa Nee album	Wa Wa Nee	1986	"Who Made Who" single	AC/DC
1986	Nobody Likes a Thinker album	Massappeal	1986	Jack album	John Farnham
1987	At First Sight, Violets Are Blue album	The Stems	1987	Mayhemic Destruction album	Mortal Sin
1987	Noiseworks album	Noiseworks	1987	feedtime album	feedtime
1989	Safety in Numbers album	Margaret Urlich	1989	Cyclone Raymond album	Mental As Anything
1990	Blue Sky Mining album	Midnight Oil	1991	Live Baby Live album	INXS
1992	Welcome to Wherever You Are album	INXS	1992	"Four Seasons in One Day" single	Crowded House
1992	Ferry Boat Fred album	ABC Music	1995	The Infamous album	Mobb Deep
1998	Once in a LIVEtime album	Dream Theater	1996	"Macarena" (Bayside Boys Mix) Remix	Los del Rio
1996	Chicago Original Broadway Cast album	Chicago Musical	1997	Nine Lives album	Aerosmith
1997	Falling into Infinity album	Dream Theater	1998	NSYNC album	NSYNC
1988	Cruel Summer album	Ace of Base	1998	The Winter Album album	NSYNC
1998	I'm Telling You for the Last Time album	Jerry Seinfeld	1998	Gift of Love album	Deepak Chopra
2000	"Most Girls" single	Pink	2001	Last Wave of Summer album	Cold Chisel
1999	Keith Urban album	Keith Urban	1999	Supernatural album	Santana
1999	Φύλακας άγγελος album	Giannis Kotsiras Adonis Mitzelos	2000	Beyond the light album	Adonis Mitzelos
2000	Beyond the Light	Adonis Mitzelos			
2002	Songs About Jane album	Maroon 5	2002	Getta A Kick album	Diesel
2002	Get the Party Started Remix	Pink	2002	"This Love" single	Maroon 5
2002	Dance for Me album	Mary J. Blige	2002	Perihelion album	Deep Purple
2002	Feast on Scraps album	Alanis Morissette	2002	The Morning After album	Deborah Cox
2003	Motown album	Boyz II Men	2003	Ride 'Til I Die album	George Thorogood and the Destroyers
2004	BigBigLove album	Little Birdy	2004	Revolutions album	The X-Ecutioners
2004	Chariot album	Gavin DeGraw	2004	A Song Is a City album	Eskimo Joe
2004	Astronaut album	Duran Duran	2004	Under My Skin album	Avril Lavigne
2005	Songs for Silverman album	Ben Folds	2005	Flyleaf album	Flyleaf
2005	Solid Gold Hits album	Beastie Boys	2006	Home album	Collective Soul
2006	"Hurt" single	Christina Aguilera	2006	Coming Home album	Lionel Richie
2006	The Hard Stuff album	George Thorogood and the Destroyers	2007	Divas album	Andrew Lloyd Webber
2008	What a Life album	Adam Brand	2008	Good Girl Gone Bad album	Rihanna
2008	Folie a Deux album	Fall Out Boy	2008	Black Clouds & Silver Linings	Dream Theater
2008	"Mercy" Remix	Duffy	2008	"Touch My Body" Remix	Mariah Carey
2009	Golden Rule album	Powderfinger	2009	Sgt. Pepper Live album	Cheap Trick
2009	The Resistance album	Muse	2010	Bliss Release album	Cloud Control
2010	Love the Fall EP	Michael Paynter	2010	"Just Say So" single	Brian McFadden
2010	Modern Day Addiction album	Clare Bowditch	2010	"Animal" single	Dash and Will
2010	With Emperor Antarctica EP	Boy & Bear	2011	Ghosts of the Past album	Eskimo Joe
2011	Kosciuszko album	Jebediah	2011	The Ending Is Just the Beginning Repeating album	The Living End
2011	"Talk Talk Talk" single	Darren Hayes	2011	Put Your Hands Up (If You Feel Love) EP	Kylie Minogue
2011	Beats & Blips album	Marvin Priest	2011	Australian Idle album	Tim Freedman
2011	Fingerprints and Footprints album	Powderfinger	2012	Christmas EP	Delta Goodrem
2012	The Sapphires: Original Motion Picture Soundtrack album	The Sapphires	2012	Pope Innocent X album	Bertie Blackman
2012	Child of the Universe album	Delta Goodrem	2012	"Battle Scars" single	Guy Sebastian
2012	No Plans album	Cold Chisel	2012	"Just a Game" single	Birdy
2013	Thirty album	Anthony Callea	2013	Blue Sky Blue (The Byron Bay Sessions) album	Pete Murray
2013	The Christmas Album album	Human Nature	2013	God Loves You When You're Dancing EP	Vance Joy
2013	Kensal Road album	Kate Ceberano	2013	Goin' Your Way album	Neil Finn and Paul Kelly
2014	Sea of Approval album	Andy Bull	2014	Beautiful (Platinum Edition) album	Jessica Mauboy
2014	30:30 Hindsight album	Jimmy Barnes	2014	Flesh & Blood album	John Butler Trio
2014	"Super Love" single	Dami Im	2014	"Que Sera" single	Justice Crew
2014	Love of Cartography album	sleepmakeswaves	2014	"Create/Destroy" single	Art vs. Science
2014	Here's to You & I album	The McClymonts	2014	The Beard Album album	The Beards
2018	Penetr8	The Marion Cranes	2020	"What?" single	SB19
2020	zero_one album	The Living Tombstone	2021	Pebble House, Vol. 1: Kuwaderno album	Ben&Ben
2021	In Sound Mind (The Original Soundtrack) album	The Living Tombstone	2025	FNAFdom (Live) EP	The Living Tombstone
