= The Living Tombstone discography =

Electric rock duo discography

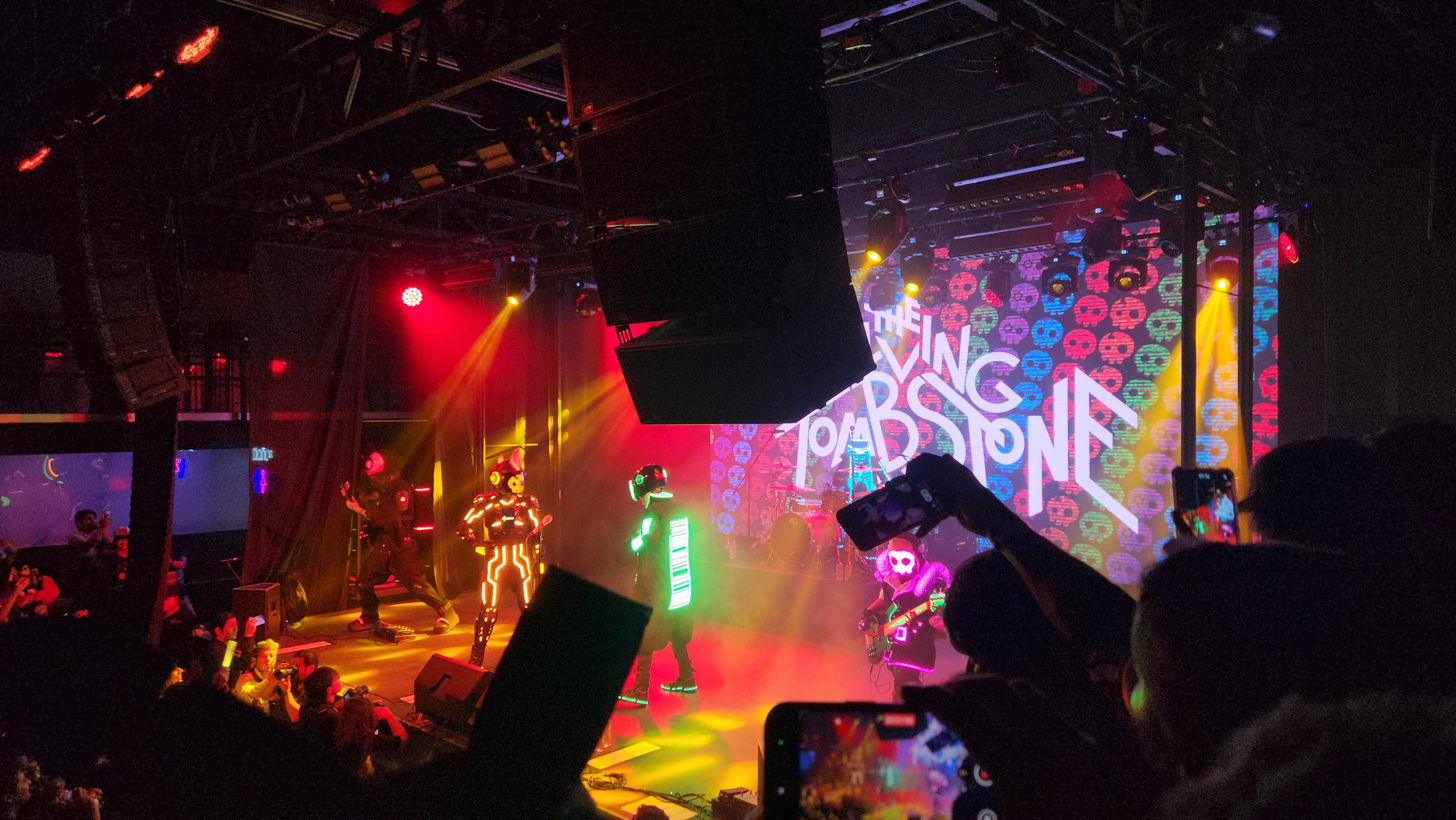
- The Living Tombstone performing in 2024
- Studio albums: 2
- EPs: 3
- Soundtrack albums: 7 (Note: Featured on 3 additional soundtracks as a guest composer, for a total of 10 soundtracks)
- Live albums: 1
- Compilation albums: 2
- Remix albums: 3
- Singles: 80 (Note: Featured on 69 additional singles, for a total of 149 singles)
- Remixes: 101
- Songwriting and Production credits: 12

The Living Tombstone (TLT) is an electronic rock band and YouTube channel, founded as a solo project by Israeli-American producer Yoav Landau (Hebrew: יואב לנדאו) in 2011, and became a musical duo with American singer Sam Haft in 2016. From 2011 to present-day, the Living Tombstone has released 80 singles over the course of its lifespan.

== Albums ==
=== Studio albums ===
- Zero One (2020)
- Rust (2025)

=== Live albums ===
- Live in '25 (2026)

=== Remix albums ===
- Tombstone Remixes (2013)
- Zero One: Reloaded (2021)
- Rust: Revolutions! (2026)

=== Compilation albums ===
- Zero One: Deluxe (2023)
- Internet Childhood (2024)

== Soundtracks ==
- Portal: The Flash Version MapPack – Original Soundtrack (2008) (Yoav Landau as "Koolfox")
- Nightmare House 2 (Official Soundtrack) (2010) (Yoav Landau as "Koolfox")
- MFP: My Friend Pedro (Original Soundtrack) (2014)
- In Sound Mind (The Original Soundtrack) (2021)
- Hazbin Hotel (Original Soundtrack) (2024) (Sam Haft)
- Hazbin Hotel: Season Two (Original Soundtrack) (2025) (Sam Haft)
- Nightmare House: Reimagined – Original Soundtrack (TBA)

=== As guest composer ===
- Beat Saber (Original Game Soundtrack), Vol V (2022) and Shock Drops (2025)
- Five Nights at Freddy's (2023)
- Five Nights at Freddy's 2 (2025)

== EPs ==
- Bad Times (2023) (Sam Haft)
- I Love You Too (2025) (Yoav Landau as "SugarVision")
- FNAFdom (Live) (2025)

== Singles ==
=== As lead artist ===
List of singles as lead artist, with selected chart positions and certifications, showing year released and album name
Title	Year	Peak chart positions		Certifications	Album
Title	Year	US Dance/Elec.	UK Ind. Breakers	Certifications	Album
"Cracks"	2011	—	—		Non-album singles
"Rainbow NukeStep"	2011	—	—		Non-album singles
"September" (featuring Mic the Microphone and PinkieSkye)	2011	—	—		Non-album singles
"Sister Hate" (featuring Mic the Microphone)	2011	—	—		Non-album singles
"Good Ol' Days" (featuring Mic the Microphone and JackleApp)	2011	—	—		Non-album singles
"Like a Spinning Record"	2011	—	—		Non-album singles
"Party Cannon"	2011	—	—		Non-album singles
"Louise the Lab Rat"	2012	—	—		Non-album singles
"Octavia's Overture"	2012	—	—		Non-album singles
"לעוף (Fly)"	2012	—	—		Non-album singles
"Magic" (featuring Lauren G.)	2012	—	—		Non-album singles
"Stuck in Time" (with Bronyfied)	2012	—	—		Non-album singles
"Dubstep Dishwasher"	2012	—	—		Non-album singles
"Doodle" (with Temporal Walker)	2012	—	—		Non-album singles
"Good Girl" (with Dasha)	2012	—	—		Non-album singles
"Mic the Microphone's 21st Birthday Song!!!" (featuring LilDeuceDeuce)	2012	—	—		Non-album singles
"Hush" (with Archie)	2012	—	—		Full Pon-ography
"Ignition" (with Silva Hound)	2012	—	—		Bass Rocket EP
"Spyro Does a Thing (Remix)"	2013	—	—		Non-album singles
"Run, Shoot, Kill... and Cry"	2013	—	—		Four's Fall Down
"Tachles (תכלס)"	2013	—	—		Non-album singles
"Bec (Happy Birthday Bexy)"	2013	—	—		Non-album singles
"Jumping Devil"	2013	—	—		Non-album singles
"Cats"	2013	—	—		Non-album singles
"Manehattan" (with Asi Meskin)	2014	—	—		Non-album singles
"Collecting Cookies" (with Mic the Microphone)	2014	—	—		Non-album singles
"Quartermaster" (featuring Automatic Jack and Nexgen)	2014	—	—		Non-album singles
"The Road to El Dorado Remix!"	2014	—	—		Non-album singles
"Five Nights at Freddy's"	2014	4	8	RIAA: Gold	Non-album singles
"It's Been So Long"	2014	—	—		Non-album singles
"Markiplier Rock Opera" (with Project RnL)	2015	—	—		Non-album singles
"Die in a Fire" (featuring EileMonty and Orko)	2015	—	18		Non-album singles
"Dog of Wisdom (Blue Version)" (featuring Joe Gran)	2015	—	—		Non-album singles
"Dog of Wisdom (Red Version)" (featuring Joe Gran)	2015	—	—		Non-album singles
"Squid Melody (Blue Version)"	2015	—	—		Non-album singles
"Squid Melody (Red Version)"	2015	—	—		Non-album singles
"Dead Kitten Song"	2015	—	—		Non-album singles
"I Got No Time"	2016	—	—		Non-album singles
"Two Handed Great Sword (Remix)"	2016	—	—		Non-album singles
"I Can't Fix You" (with Crusher-P)	2016	—	—		Non-album singles
"No Mercy" (featuring BlackGryph0n and LittleJayneyCakes)	2017	—	—		Non-album singles
"Cut the Cord" (featuring EileMonty)	2017	—	—		Non-album singles
"1000 Doors (Spooky's Jump Scare Mansion Song)" (featuring BSlick and Crusher-P)	2017	—	—		Non-album singles
"Yumbo Bear (דובון יומבו)"	2017	—	—		Non-album singles
"My Ordinary Life"	2017	—	14	RIAA: Platinum; BPI: Silver; RMNZ: Gold	Non-album singles
"GBA SP Blue Edition Song"	2017	—	—		Non-album singles
"Circle of Death (PUBG Song)" (with Roomie and Dan Bull)	2018	—	—		Non-album singles
"Basics in Behavior (Blue Version)" (featuring OR3O)	2018	—	—		Non-album singles
"Basics in Behavior (Red Version)" (featuring OR3O)	2018	—	—		Non-album singles
"Pikachu's Lament (Blue Version)" (featuring Sam & Bill)	2018	—	—		Non-album singles
"Pikachu's Lament (Red Version)" (featuring Sam & Bill)	2018	—	—		Non-album singles
"Right Now (Blue Version)" (featuring Damsel is Depressed, Emi Jones and Sam Haft)	2018	—	—		Non-album singles
"Right Now (Red Version)" (Note: Later removed) (featuring Damsel is Depressed, Emi Jones and Sam Haft)	2019	—	—		Non-album singles
"Memory" (featuring Sam Haft, Emi Jones and Vylet Pony)	2019	—	—		Non-album singles
"Goose Goose Revolution"	2020	—	—		
"Drunk"	2020	—	—		Zero One
"A Doll's House" (featuring Hayley Nelson)	2020	—	—		In Sound Mind (The Original Soundtrack)
"Alastor's Game"	2020	—	—		Non-album single
"Sunburn"	2020	—	—		Zero One
"Love I Need"	2020	—	—		Non-album single
"Chosen"	2020	—	—		Zero One
"Hunters" (featuring Dan Bull, Izzy Deluxe and Schäffer the Darklord)	2021	—	—		Non-album singles
"Getting Bigger" (featuring Daniel J. Edwards and Cassie Ewulu)	2021	—	—		Non-album singles
"Report, Report, Report!" (featuring Kellen Goff)	2021	—	—		Non-album singles
"Here Comes a Savior (In Sound Mind Theme)" (featuring Mick "Ricepirate" Lauer)	2021	—	—		In Sound Mind (The Original Soundtrack)
"Temporary Love" (with CG5)	2022	—	—		Non-album singles
"Hit the Snooze"	2022	—	—		Non-album singles
"This Comes from Inside"	2022	—	—		Non-album singles
"Trapped"	2022	—	—		Non-album singles
"4get" (with CG5 & OR3O)	2023	—	—		Non-album singles
"Five Nights at Freddy's (10th Anniversary)" (with Charlie Rosen & the 8-Bit Big Band)	2024	—	—		Non-album singles
"Be Alone"	2025	—	—		Rust
"I Walk Ahead Of You"	2025	—	—		Rust
"Malibu Pier"	2025	—	—		Rust
"Orphans"	2025	—	—		Rust
"Step On Up" (featuring McGwire)	2025	—	—		Non-album singles
"Fight Til I'm Good Enough" (featuring Elsie Lovelock, Michael Kovach & Allanah Fitzgerald)	2025	—	—		Non-album singles
"It's Been So Long - Live"	2025	—	—		FNAFdom (Live) and Live in '25
"It Doesn't Matter"	2026	—	—		Non-album singles
"Don’t Hang Up The Call"	2026	—	—		Non-album singles

=== As featured artist ===
List of singles, showing year released and album name
Title	Year	Peak chart positions	Album
Title	Year	US Dance/Elec.	Album
"Throw It in the Bag" (MC Melod¥ Doll feat. Kiki Cake & Half-Bonnet)	2011	—	Non-album singles
"Love Me Cheerilee" (WoodenToaster)	2012	—	Non-album singles
"16 NOCAB"	2012	—	100% No Feeble Cheering
"Lost on the Moon" (WoodenToaster featuring Rina-chan)	2012	—	Non-album singles
"Heavy's Pizza Song" (RubberFruit featuring 2007excalibur2007)	2012	—	Non-album singles
"Reading for Days" (Scraton)	2012	—	Non-album singles
"Buy Mo' Brand" (MC Melod¥ Doll)	2013	—	Buy Mo' Brand
"Moving On" (TwentyTen featuring Amethyst Glimmershine)	2013	—	Non-album singles
"Ugly"	2013	—	Breakbutt
"Michael & Stephanie"	2013	—	TOME: The Official Soundtrack
"Survive the Virus"	2013	—	TOME: The Official Soundtrack
"Survive the Virus Dance Mix"	2013	—	TOME: The Official Soundtrack
"Bold Challenges Ahead"	2013	—	TOME: The Official Soundtrack
"Goomba Got Back" (featuring Gaijin Goombah)	2014	—	Non-album singles
"Fun Dead Theme"	2014	—	Legacy Soundtrack
"Rock 5"	2014	—	Legacy Soundtrack
"Zomtage"	2014	—	Legacy Soundtrack
"Space Face Part 1 Theme"	2014	—	Legacy Soundtrack
"Zombieland"	2014	—	Legacy Soundtrack
"Fun Dead 8-Bit"	2014	—	Legacy Soundtrack
"Abducted"	2014	—	Legacy Soundtrack
"Asdfland" (featuring LilDeuceDeuce)	2014	—	Legacy Soundtrack
"Space Face Intro"	2014	—	Legacy Soundtrack
"Creepy Girl"	2014	—	Legacy Soundtrack
"Space Face Intro"	2014	—	Legacy Soundtrack
"Legacy"	2014	—	Legacy Soundtrack
"Earthbound" (Archie)	2014	—	The Dessolation of Archie
"Violet Eyes" (Archie)	2014	—	The Dessolation of Archie
"O.G.L." (MC Melod¥ Doll)	2014	—	O.G.L.
"Sofdti Awakens"	2015	—	TOME: The Official Soundtrack II
"Dragon of the Cold Steel's Mettle"	2015	—	TOME: The Official Soundtrack II
"Boisterous Braggarts re-Branded"	2015	—	TOME: The Official Soundtrack II
"Slightly More Important Boss Fight"	2015	—	TOME: The Official Soundtrack II
"The Hacker Factor Multiplies"	2015	—	TOME: The Official Soundtrack II
"Plan Z"	2015	—	TOME: The Official Soundtrack II
"Mike 'n Steph"	2015	—	TOME: The Official Soundtrack II
"Dance of the Queen"	2015	—	TOME: The Official Soundtrack II
"Something's Not Right"	2015	—	TOME: The Official Soundtrack II
"Game Dev at Netking Software"	2015	—	TOME: The Official Soundtrack II
"The Virus (Has Appeared)"	2015	—	TOME: The Official Soundtrack II
"A Bleak=Hopeful Future"	2015	—	TOME: The Official Soundtrack II
"Confrontation"	2015	—	TOME: The Official Soundtrack II
"To Be Concluded"	2015	—	TOME: The Official Soundtrack II
"Sofdti Asleep"	2015	—	TOME: The Official Soundtrack II
"Main Theme"	2016	—	Final Fantasy VII Machinabridged: Midgar Mix
"Survive the Drama (Zetto's Song)"	2016	—	TOME: 5-Year Anniversary Special Album
"Swarm" (feat. KLRX)	2019	—	Homeward
"U.B.U. by Pheturin"	2020	—	Non-album singles
"Arriving at the Balancenter"	2021	—	Terrain of Magical Expertise: Complete Original Soundtrack
"Trekking Across Fimicola Field"	2021	—	Terrain of Magical Expertise: Complete Original Soundtrack
"Venturing into Jacksonii Jungle"	2021	—	Terrain of Magical Expertise: Complete Original Soundtrack
"Dream-Filled Performance (Opening Act)"	2021	—	Terrain of Magical Expertise: Complete Original Soundtrack
"Dream-Filled Performance (Rising Action)"	2021	—	Terrain of Magical Expertise: Complete Original Soundtrack
"The Bustling of Goldhattan Square"	2021	—	Terrain of Magical Expertise: Complete Original Soundtrack
"Just Monsters, Yo - Telluria City"	2021	—	Terrain of Magical Expertise: Complete Original Soundtrack
"City-Life Skirmish"	2021	—	Terrain of Magical Expertise: Complete Original Soundtrack
"Trekking across Silva Isle"	2021	—	Terrain of Magical Expertise: Complete Original Soundtrack
"Drivin' That Car"	2021	—	Terrain of Magical Expertise: Complete Original Soundtrack
"Venturing into Alluminz Alley"	2021	—	Terrain of Magical Expertise: Complete Original Soundtrack
"Dream-Filled Performance (The Climax)"	2021	—	Terrain of Magical Expertise: Complete Original Soundtrack
"Trekking Across Lychee Lagoon"	2021	—	Terrain of Magical Expertise: Complete Original Soundtrack
"Towards Our Magnificent Ending"	2021	—	Terrain of Magical Expertise: Complete Original Soundtrack
"Arriving at the Highlight Heavens"	2021	—	Terrain of Magical Expertise: Complete Original Soundtrack
"Dream-Filled Performance (The Twist)"	2021	—	Terrain of Magical Expertise: Complete Original Soundtrack
"Dream-Filled Performance (The Resolution)"	2021	—	Terrain of Magical Expertise: Complete Original Soundtrack
"I Wanna Be a Machine"	2022	—	Beat Saber (Original Game Soundtrack), Vol. V
"Stuck Inside" (Black Gryph0n feat. Baasik & Kevin Foster)	2023	34	Non-album singles
"A Sinsmas Party (I'll Murder You)" (featuring Cristina Vee)	2025	—	Helluva Boss: Season Two (Original Soundtrack)
"Merry Sinsmas" (featuring Benny Benack III)	2025	—	Helluva Boss: Season Two (Original Soundtrack)

== Remixes ==
List of remixes, showing original artists, year released and album name
Title	Original artists	Year	Album
"Melting Pot of Alcohol (The Living Tombstone's Remix)"	Alex S. (featuring GhostPolitics)	2011	Non-album singles
"Plastic Smile (Remix)"	Perfume	2011	Non-album singles
"Party With Pinkie (Remix)"	Alex S.	2011	Non-album singles
"melody pet remix (Remix)"	DQN ILLMINATIONZ & 錯覚	2011	Non-album singles
"Willy Bum Bum (Remix)"	ALIEN REd WOLf	2011	Non-album singles
"Winter Wrap Up (Remix)"	Daniel Ingram	2011	Non-album singles
"Beyond her Garden (Remix)"	WoodenToaster	2011	Non-album singles
"Summer (Remix)"	JackleApp	2011	Seasons
"Pinkie Piggy (Remix)"	Daniel Ingram	2012	Non-album singles
"Discord (Remix)"	Eurobeat Brony	2012	Non-album singles
"Chop Suey (Remix)"	System of a Down	2012	Non-album singles
"Flim and Flam (Remix)"	Daniel Ingram	2012	Non-album singles
"One Trick Pony (Remix)"	JackleApp & Mic The Microphone	2012	Non-album singles
"Smile Song (Remix)"	Daniel Ingram	2012	Non-album singles
"What You Do (Remix)"	The Queenstons	2012	Non-album singles
"Atomizer (Remix)" (featuring Ibeabronyrapper)	Furries in a Blender	2012	Non-album singles
"After Midnight (Remix)"	Rocket Ship Resort & ShadyVox	2012	Non-album singles
"Song of Storms (Remix)"	Koji Kondo	2012	Non-album singles
"Pony Rock Anthem (Remix)"	ShadyVox	2012	Non-album singles
"Colgate Brushie Song (Remix)"	Rina-chan	2012	Non-album singles
"Badger Badger Badger (Remix)"	MrWeebl	2012	Non-album singles
"Saturday Night (Remix)"	Michelle Creber	2012	Timeless: Songs of a Century
Immortality (The Living Tombstone Remix)	Mor Avrahami (featuring LIHI)	2012	Non-album singles
"Babs Seed (Remix)"	Daniel Ingram	2012	Non-album singles
"Hooves Up High (Remix)" (featuring EileMonty)	Silva Hound	2012	Bass Rocket EP: 5th Anniversary Edition
"Gypsy Bard [remix]"	Griffin Lewis	2013	Non-album singles
"Nightmare Night (Remix)"	WoodenToaster & Mic the Microphone	2013	Tombstone Remixes
"Neverending Strife (Remix)"	H8 Seed	2013	Tombstone Remixes
"Pinkie's Brew (Remix)"	Sherclop Pones	2013	Tombstone Remixes
"Friendship (Remix)"	Aviators	2013	Tombstone Remixes
"Luna (Remix)"	Eurobeat Brony	2013	Tombstone Remixes
"More Than a Chicken (Remix)"	General Mumble	2013	Tombstone Remixes; De Remicks: Vol. 2
"Rainbow Factory (Remix)"	WoodenToaster	2013	Tombstone Remixes
"Save The Badger (Remix)"	MrWeebl	2013	Non-album singles
"Computer Guy (Remix)"	Savlonic	2013	Non-album singles
"Shade Man's Stage Theme (Remix)"	Toshihiko Horiyama, Yüko Takehara & Makoto Tomozawa	2013	Non-album singles
"Taking Flight (Remix)"	d.notice	2013	The Fantasy
"Spooky Scary Skeletons (Remix)"	Andrew Gold	2013	Non-album singles
"Absolute Territory (Remix)"	Ken Ashcorp	2013	Non-album singles
"Jenny (Remix)"	Studio Killers	2013	Non-album singles
"Hampire (Remix)"	LilDeuceDeuce	2014	Non-album singles
"Final Transmission (Remix)"	Temporal Walker & [voodoopony]	2014	Non-album singles
"Stop The Bats (Remix)"	Daniel Ingram	2014	Non-album singles
"Make a Wish (Remix)" (with μThunder)	Daniel Ingram	2014	Non-album singles
"Stay (Remix)"	Knife Pony (featuring Feather)	2014	Stay (The Remixes)
"Rats (The Living Tombstone's Remix)"	mrSimon	2014	Spirit
"Sorry Jack (The Living Tombstone Remix)"	Scratch21	2014	Non-album singles
"Wild Fire (The Living Tombstone Remix)"	Silva Hound	2014	Wild Fire EP
"Beat It (Remix)"	Black Gryph0n, Baasik & Michelle Creber	2015	Tribute (Celebrating the Music of Michael Jackson)
"Atop The Fourth Wall Remix (AT4W)"	Vincent E.L.	2015	Non-album singles
"Christmas, Baby Please Come Home (Remix)"	Michelle Creber	2015	A Creber Christmas
"Artificial Intelligence Bomb (The Living Tombstone Remix)"	STAFFcirc	2016	STAFFcirc vol. 2 - AI BOMB VARIATIONS
"Ghostbusters Theme Song Remix"	Ray Parker Jr.	2016	Non-album singles
"Bonetrousle Remix"	Toby Fox	2016	Non-album singles
"Grim Grinning Ghosts (The Living Tombstone Remix)" (featuring Crusher P & Corpse Husband)	Buddy Baker & X Atencio	2016	Non-album singles
"It's Raining Men Remix" featuring Eilemonty	The Weather Girls	2016	Non-album singles
"We Are Number One Remix but by The Living Tombstone"	Máni Svavarsson & Stefán Karl Stefánsson	2016	Non-album singles
"Carol of the Bells (The Living Tombstone Remix)"	Peter Wilhousky	2016	Non-album singles
"Epoch (The Living Tombstone's Remix)"	Savlonic	2017	Neon Remixes
"Don't Tattle On Me Remix"	Caleb Hyles & Fandroid	2017	Non-album singles
"Bendy and the Ink Machine Remix" (featuring DAGames)	Kyle Allen	2017	Non-album singles
"Beep Beep Im a Sheep Remix" (featuring TomSka & Black Gryph0n)	LilDeuceDeuce	2017	Non-album singles
"ECHO (The Living Tombstone Remix)"	Crusher-P	2017	Non-album singles
"Jump Up, Super Star! Remix"	Naoto Kubo & Noboyoshi Suzuki	2017	Non-album singles
"Goodbye Moonmen (The Living Tombstone Remix)"	Ryan Elder, David Phillips & Dan Harmon	2017	Non-album singles
"Clip Joint Calamity (The Living Tombstone Remix)"	Kristofer Maddigan	2017	Non-album singles
"Floral Fury (The Living Tombstone Remix)"	Kristofer Maddigan	2017	Non-album singles
"Last Christmas (The Living Tombstone Remix)"	Wham!	2017	Non-album singles
"Inkwell Isle One (The Living Tombstone Remix)"	Kristofer Maddigan	2018	Non-album singles
"Globglogabgalab Remix (Blue Version)"	David Hutter	2018	Non-album singles
"Globglogabgalab Remix (Red Version)"	David Hutter	2018	Non-album singles
"I Don't Know What Sex Is Remix (Blue Version)"	Sam and Bill	2018	Non-album singles
"Long Time Friends (Spooky Mix)"	The Living Tombstone	2020	Non-album singles
"Drunk (BVSSIC Remix)"	The Living Tombstone	2021	zero_one:reloaded
"Long Time Friends (YungNoodizzle Remix)"	The Living Tombstone	2021	zero_one:reloaded
"zero_one (Camellia Remix)"	The Living Tombstone	2021	zero_one:reloaded
"Anthropology (The Living Tombstone Remix)"	Awkward Marina	2022	Anthropology: 10th Anniversary Remixes
"No Mercy [Overwatch 2 Remix]" (featuring Black Gryph0n, Jayn & Dan Bull)	The Living Tombstone	2022	Non-album singles
"Cats (2023 Remix)"	The Living Tombstone	2023	Non-album singles
"Witches, Witches, Witches (The Living Tombstone Remix)"	Andrew Gold	2023	Non-album singles
"Join Us for a Bite Remix"	JT Music	2023	Non-album singles
"Five Nights At Freddy's (Goth Remix)" (featuring Black Gryph0n & Baasik)	The Living Tombstone	2023	Non-album singles
"Afterburn (The Living Tombstone Remix)"	Sam Haft	2023	Badder Times (Deluxe)
"Stuck Inside (CG5 Remix)" (featuring Baasik & Kevin Foster)	Black Gryph0n	2023	Non-album singles
"Stuck Inside (Green Skeleton Remix)" (featuring Baasik)	Black Gryph0n	2024	Stuck Inside (Remixes)
"Stuck Inside (ByteJam Remix)" (featuring Baasik)	Black Gryph0n	2024	Stuck Inside (Remixes)
"Poison (Hazbin Hotel Original Soundtrack) - Official Remix"	Blake Roman, Sam Haft, Andrew Underberg	2024	Non-album singles
"Slave To The Factory Line Remix"	DAGames	2024	Press Start to Rewind
"Croc Main Theme (Living Tombstone Remasterful Remix)	Justin Scharvona, Karin Griffin, Martin Gwynn Jones	2024	Non-album singles
"Everything Is Fine (Remix)"	Qbomb	2025	Non-album singles
"Kill Us All (BVSSIC and Staysick Remix)"	The Living Tombstone	2026	Rust: Revolutions!
"Be Alone (Mystery Skulls Remix)"	The Living Tombstone	2026	Rust: Revolutions!
"I Walk Ahead Of You (McGwire and CG5 Remix)"	The Living Tombstone	2026	Rust: Revolutions!
"Somebody (TOKYO MACHINE Remix)"	The Living Tombstone	2026	Rust: Revolutions!
"Rust (YI Remix)"	The Living Tombstone	2026	Rust: Revolutions!
"Boulder (Tracey Brakes Remix)"	The Living Tombstone	2026	Rust: Revolutions!
"Orphans (Boom Kitty Remix)"	The Living Tombstone	2026	Rust: Revolutions!
"Goliath (Savlonic Remix)"	The Living Tombstone	2026	Rust: Revolutions!
"Malibu Pier (SugarVision Remix)"	The Living Tombstone	2026	Rust: Revolutions!
"This Will Be Our Year (Qbomb Remix)"	The Living Tombstone	2026	Rust: Revolutions!
"Misery (The Living Tombstone Remix)"	Pupsies	2026	Non-album singles

== Songwriting and production credits ==
Title	Artist	Year	Album	Credits
"Again"	Araki, Crusher-P	2016	The Sky's the Limit	Producer
"Rinse, Repeat"	Crusher-P	2017	Concientia	Producer
"Would You Rather"	Crusher-P	2017	Concientia	Producer
"Rooftop"	Sam Haft	2022	Bad Times (EP)	Songwriter, Producer
"Grow Up"	Sam Haft, CG5	2023	Bad Times (EP)	Songwriter, Producer
"Kitty"	Band of Silver	2023	Archduke	Songwriter
"Archduke"	Band of Silver	2023	Archduke	Songwriter
"2D"	Band of Silver	2024	Simulation	Songwriter
"If This Is A Game"	Band of Silver	2024	Simulation	Songwriter
"Training Arc"	Band of Silver	2025	Double Agent (EP); Superfan (EP); Sidestep; Liminal Space	Songwriter
"Welcome to My World It's a Mess"	Band of Silver	2025	Double Agent (EP); Superfan (EP); Sidestep; Liminal Space	Songwriter
"CYBERIA"	Yukigloom	2026	Yuki no nikki	Producer, Songwriter
