= Gamer (album) =

GAMER

Studio album by CG5
- Released: October 16, 2026
- Recorded: 2022–2026
- Genre: Pop
- Length: 27:22
- Labels: CG5; Virgin
- Producer: CG5

CG5 chronology
Project U Move (2025)	GAMER (2026)

Singles from Gamer
- 1. "I Don't Like You" Released: June 26, 2026; 2. "Fanatic" Released: July 31, 2026; 3. "Go, Go, Go (feat. Ironmouse)" Released: August 28, 2026; 4. "Race To Win" Released: October 2, 2026

Gamer (stylized in all uppercase) is the second studio album by American singer-songwriter, music producer, and YouTuber Charlie Green, otherwise known as CG5. It was released on October 16, 2026, through Virgin Music Group. The album is largely inspired by video games that Green has played and blends electropop, synthpop, dance-pop, and EDM.

The album was supported by 4 singles released across June 2026 to October 2026 with singles "I Don't Like You", "Fanatic", "Go Go Go", and "Race to Win". In October 24, CG5 announced a tour of the album called The Gamer Tour which will start in January 2027 until June 2027.

== Track listing ==
All tracks are written by CG5, except when noted.

GAMER track listing
No.	Title	Length
1.	"Fanatic"	2:04
2.	"am i allowed to feel love now"	2:08
3.	"My Opinions"	2:00
4.	"Fall 4 Me" (featuring Diaravox)	2:21
5.	"GO GO GO" (featuring Ironmouse)	2:23
6.	"Flame In Your Heart"	2:08
7.	"foregone conclusion"	0:40
8.	"I DON'T LIKE YOU"	2:26
9.	"Prisoner"	2:31
10.	"Lie & Lie" (featuring Sophie Pecora)	2:47
11.	"s w i m"	1:23
12.	"Race To Win"	1:59
13.	"WAR"	2:26
Total length:		27:22
