= Show Yourself =

Show Yourself may refer to:

- "Show Yourself", a B-side to Jefferson Starship's 1978 single "Runaway"
- "Show Yourself", a song from Tim Finn's 2006 album Imaginary Kingdom
- "Show Yourself", a 2013 single by Konshens
- "Show Yourself" (Mastodon song), from the 2017 album Emperor of Sand
- "Show Yourself" (Disney song), from the 2019 film Frozen II
- "Showyourself", a song from Montaigne's 2019 album Complex
- "Show Yourself", a 2020 song by CG5 based on the video game Among Us
- "Show Yourself", a 2005 episode of The Closer
