= CG5 (musician) =

American musician and YouTuber (born 1999)

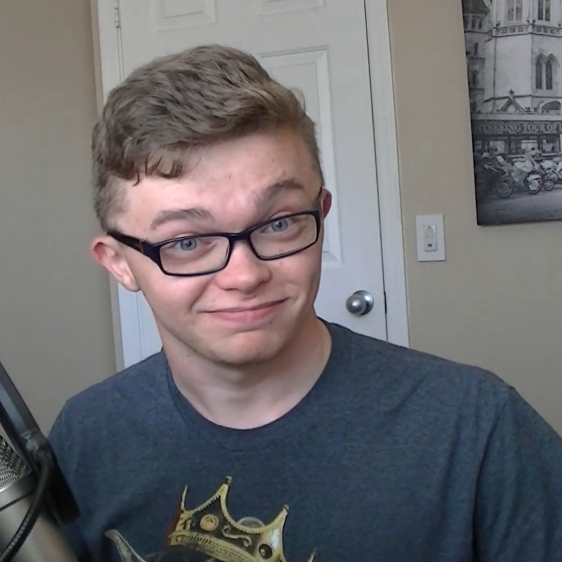
- CG5 in 2017

Background information
- Born: Charles Duncan Green V May 10, 1999 (age 27); Phoenix, Arizona, US
- Genres: Pop; electronic; EDM; rock; nerdcore
- Occupations: Singer; songwriter; producer; actor
- Years active: 2012–present
- Label: Virgin
- Spouse: Emma Grace (m. 2024)
- Website: cg5music.com

YouTube information
- Channels: CG5 CG5LIVE CG5 Instrumentals CG5Covers CG5Clips Charlie Green
- Years active: 2012–present
- Genre: Music
- Subscribers: 13 million (combined) (Note: Subscribers, broken down by channel: 10.4 million (CG5) 750 thousand (CG5LIVE) 136 thousand (CG5 Instrumentals) 130 thousand (CG5Covers) 8.76 thousand (CG5Clips) 6.24 thousand (Charlie Green))
- Views: 6 billion (combined) (Note: Views, broken down by channel: 4.23 billion (CG5) 108 million (CG5LIVE) 10.63 million (CG5 Instrumentals) 6.02 million (CG5Covers) 111 thousand (CG5Clips) 228 thousand (Charlie Green))
- Last updated: January 7, 2025

Charles Duncan Green V (born May 10, 1999), better known professionally as CG5, is an American singer-songwriter, music producer, and YouTuber. He is well known for making nerdcore hip-hop songs about various topics relating to video games and internet culture. He is also the director of the horror series and film hybrid Project U Move.

== Early life ==
Charles Duncan Green V was born on May 10, 1999, in Phoenix, Arizona. Green has three siblings and is the fifth generation of his name in the family. Green started making music when he was five years old, using software on his father's computer. Green and his family moved to Arizona when he was 12 years old, transferring throughout multiple high schools until he graduated from Highland High School in Gilbert, Arizona. Green was a member of a church choir, and took a radio/audio production class while in high school. Green additionally worked as a front counter at Chick-fil-A. He later pursued music full time after graduating high school.

== Music career ==
Green started posting on YouTube under his name in mid-2012, releasing his first original song, "What Is a Dream". Green continued releasing original and cover songs on SoundCloud and YouTube. In 2014, he released his first extended play on SoundCloud, Celadon.

Green created CG5, his current channel, in October 2014 and initially released remixes of popular songs and video game soundtracks on the channel. In 2015, he released his second extended play, Turning Gray. The name for the channel was chosen because he is the 5th generation Charlie Green in his family.

At this time, Green decided to stop posting on his old channel in favor of his new channel, CG5, after his recent songs that were posted on the new channel went viral and he gained millions of views, and at the same time decided to pursue posting on the channel under the nerdcore hip-hop genre. Around the same time, he renamed one of his channels from "CHARLES" to "CG5LIVE", while also repurposing it to focus on behind-the-scenes videos of songs, non-music content, and edited-down videos of his live streams.

In March 2020, Green released his debut album, Patiently. In September 2020, Green released his single, "Show Yourself", based on the video game, Among Us, which reached over 100 million views on YouTube.

On July 1, 2022, Green sang the US national anthem for the Red Sox in the Wrigley Field. On January 27, 2023, Green collaborated with artist LeGrand, re-releasing his single, "Give a Little". The song became popular on TikTok, from a remixed line by Green.

In June 2023, Green released his single "Grimace", based on the Grimace Shake trend. In July 2023, Green released his single "THX", based on the web series Skibidi Toilet.

On May 10, 2024, Green's birthday, he released his single "Forbidden Feeling", which is a song about his relationship anxiety. The song was well-received, with Jonathan Currinn of Good Star Vibes saying, "He has flawlessly created poetic and artistic lines that elevate this song to a whole new level."

In January 2025, Green announced the analog horror series Project U Move. The series features child actor Piper Rubio, who is known for her role in the film Five Nights at Freddy's, alongside cameos from fellow YouTubers and music artists.

In March 2025, during the 2025 Game Developers Conference, Universal Music Group revealed that they launched an initiative with Green and rapper Lil Wayne for a collaboration with motion capture library Heat, which implemented licensed songs from both musicians as well as their respective emotes. Green's songs included "I See a Dreamer", "Sleep Well", "Let Me In", and "Dancin'", among others.

Green has performed multiple tours worldwide, most notably in the United States, United Kingdom, Ireland, Netherlands and Australia. In 2025, Green performed his US leg tour "Too Many Songs", with each show having at least 50 songs from his discography sung.

== Personal life ==
Green is married to Emma Grace Green; their ceremony took place on May 4, 2024. Green previously lived in Phoenix, Arizona, but now resides in Chandler, Arizona with his wife. Green is diagnosed with autism, and obsessive–compulsive disorder (OCD).

== Discography ==
=== Albums ===
List of albums, with selected details
Title	Details
Patiently	Released: March 27, 2020; Formats: Digital download, streaming
Gamer (Note: Stylized in all caps)	Released: October 16, 2026; Formats: CD, LP, digital download, streaming

=== Extended plays ===
List of EPs, with selected details
Title	Details
Alola	Released: December 23, 2016; Formats: Digital download, streaming
FNF: CG5 Edition – Week 1	Released: February 12, 2021; Formats: Digital download, streaming
Project U Move	Released: March 28, 2025; Formats: Digital download, streaming, LP

=== Singles ===
==== As lead artist ====
List of singles, with selected details
Title	Year	Other artists	Peak chart positions	Album/EP
Title	Year	Other artists	UK Video Stream.	Album/EP
"Watch Your Six"	2016	GameChops	—	Non-album singles
"Fantasized"	2016	—	—	Non-album singles
"Thundersnail" (From Undertale)	2016	GameChops	—	Non-album singles
"Fish Out of Water"	2017	Jozu	—	Non-album singles
"Amen"	2017	—	—	Non-album singles
"Reap What You Sow"	2017	—	—	Non-album singles
"Horror Show"	2017	—	—	Non-album singles
"Weird Autumn" (From Night in the Woods)	2017	GameChops	—	Non-album singles
"Spotlight"	2017	—	—	Non-album singles
"Goodbye"	2017	—	—	Non-album singles
"I Got No Time" (remix/cover)	2017	—	—	Non-album singles
"Patient Is the Night" (cover)	2017	—	—	Non-album singles
"Crawling"	2017	—	—	Non-album singles
"You Will Believe"	2017	DAGames	—	Non-album singles
"Infinite" (remix/cover)	2017	Cosmitto	—	Non-album singles
"The Final Straw"	2017	Dolvondo	—	Non-album singles
"Without You" (remix/cover)	2017	—	—	Non-album singles
"Open Up Your Eyes" (cover/remix)	2017	—	—	Non-album singles
"Labyrinth"	2017	Fandroid!, Chi-Chi, Caleb Hyles, DAGames, Dawko	—	Non-album singles
"Absolutely Anything"	2017	OR3O	—	Non-album singles
"Your Reality" (remix/cover)	2017	Chloe DAGames	—	Non-album singles
"Find Da Wae"	2018	—	—	Non-album singles
"Find Da Wae" (Knuckles Sings Club Mix)	2018	DJ Cutman	—	Non-album singles
"Can't Get Over It"	2018	Dolvondo	—	Non-album singles
"Five Nights Only" (remix)	2018	—	—	Non-album singles
"Opinions"	2018	—	—	Non-album singles
"Hello Hello"	2018	Not a Robot	—	Non-album singles
"No More Cake"	2018	Chi-Chi, Dolvondo	—	Non-album singles
"Take It"	2018	—	—	Non-album singles
"Like It or Not"	2018	Dawko	—	Non-album singles
"Water"	2018	OR3O	—	Non-album singles
"Scared of You"	2018	Toby Turner	—	Non-album singles
"Uncrowned"	2018	Chi-Chi, SquigglyDigg, DHeusta	—	Non-album singles
"Just Another Day"	2018	DHeusta	—	Non-album singles
"I Wanna Waa"	2018	Nenorama	—	Non-album singles
"Let Me Through"	2018	Dolvondo	—	Non-album singles
"Projections"	2018	Dawko	—	Non-album singles
"If It's Too Hard to Forgive" (cover)	2018	—	—	Non-album singles
"World of Gray"	2018	Swiblet	—	Non-album singles
"CG5 Official Medley"	2018	—	—	Non-album singles
"Every Door"	2018	Caleb Hyles	—	Non-album singles
"The Bongo Cat Song"	2018	—	—	Non-album singles
"The Bongo Cat Song" (extended)	2018	—	—	Non-album singles
"Fly" (remix)	2018	—	—	Non-album singles
"The Moth and the Lamp"	2018	Jenny	—	Non-album singles
"Spooky Scary Skeletons" (remix)	2018	—	—	Non-album singles
"Masterpiece"	2018	Bslick	—	Non-album singles
"Don't Forget" (cover)	2018	—	—	Non-album singles
"Make Your Move"	2018	Dawko	—	Non-album singles
"Lancer's Theme" (remix)	2018	GameChops	—	Non-album singles
"Danny Phantom" (cover)	2018	—	—	Non-album singles
"Big Chungus"	2018	—	—	Non-album singles
"Never Easy"	2018	—	—	Non-album singles
"Lifelight" (remix/cover)	2018	—	—	Non-album singles
"Evil Team"	2019	OR3O	—	Non-album singles
"Egg"	2019	—	—	Non-album singles
"Just Friends" (remix/cover)	2019	Caleb Hyles	—	Non-album singles
"Sweet Victory" (cover)	2019	—	—	Non-album singles
"Sunflower" (cover)	2019	—	—	Non-album singles
"Follow Mii"	2019	—	—	Non-album singles
"Change Your Mind"	2019	—	—	Non-album singles
"Inzpiration"	2019	—	—	Non-album singles
"Our Destiny"	2019	—	—	Non-album singles
"The Wolf" (remix/cover)	2019	Cami-Cat, FamilyJules	—	Non-album singles
"Never Gonna Let You Go" (remix/cover)	2019	—	—	Non-album singles
"Push"	2019	—	—	Non-album singles
"I Can't Fix You" (remix/cover)	2019	—	—	Non-album singles
"Fears"	2019	DAGames	—	Non-album singles
"The Chalice"	2019	SquigglyDigg	—	Non-album singles
"Scoliosis"	2019	—	—	Non-album singles
"Ocean Man" (cover)	2019	RichaadEB	—	Non-album singles
"Dancin'" (cover)	2019	—	—	Non-album singles
"Kahoot"	2019	—	—	Non-album singles
"Shining Star" (cover)	2019	—	—	Non-album singles
"Zombies on Your Lawn" (remix/cover)	2019	Nenorama	—	Non-album singles
"See Dem Aliens"	2019	—	—	Non-album singles
"Clearer"	2019	—	—	Non-album singles
"Revenge" (remix)	2019	Annapantsu	—	Non-album singles
"Soldiers Fallen"	2019	DHeusta	—	Non-album singles
"In the Morning"	2019	—	—	Non-album singles
"Fallen Kingdom" (cover)	2019	—	—	Non-album singles
"Omae Wa Mou" (dubbed remix/cover)	2019	—	—	Non-album singles
"Stereo Love" (cover)	2019	Lollia, Insaneintherainmusic	—	Non-album singles
"Other Friends" (cover)	2019	—	—	Non-album singles
"Perfection"	2019	Dolvondo	—	Non-album singles
"Drift Away" (cover)	2019	—	—	Non-album singles
"No Matter What" (cover)	2019	Christina Vee	—	Non-album singles
"Love Isn't Fair"	2019	—	—	Patiently
"Phantom Dancing"	2020	—	—	Non-album singles
"Absolutely Anything" (2020 edit)	2020	OR3O	—	Non-album singles
"Discord" (remix/cover)	2020	DAGames, RichaadEB	—	Non-album singles
"Sepiatoned" (Note: Stylized in lowercase)	2020	—	—	Non-album singles
"Supernatural Baby"	2020	—	—	Non-album singles
"Leave Me Behind"	2020	DAGames, Daddyphansnaps	—	Patiently
"Speed Me Up" (remix/cover)	2020	NemRaps, Fabvl	—	Non-album singles
"The River"	2020	—	—	Non-album singles
"How'd You Hear Me"	2020	The Stupendium	—	Non-album singles
"Delightful Day"	2020	James Landino, Wishlyst, Dan Bull	—	Non-album singles
"To the Dungeons"	2020	NateWantsToBattle	—	Non-album singles
"Happy Accidents"	2020	—	—	Non-album singles
"Stay at Home"	2020	—	—	Non-album singles
"Being Human" (cover)	2020	—	—	Non-album singles
"Into the Unknown" (cover)	2020	—	—	Non-album singles
"The Legend of Siren Head"	2020	—	—	Non-album singles
"It's Been So Long" (remix/cover)	2020	—	—	Non-album singles
"Mystery Machine"	2020	—	—	Non-album singles
"Murder Hornet"	2020	—	—	Non-album singles
"Run N' Gun"	2020	—	—	Non-album singles
"Created Equal"	2020	—	—	Non-album singles
"Music from the Heart"	2020	—	—	Non-album singles
"Father's Day"	2020	—	—	Non-album singles
"Balance"	2020	Caleb Hyles, Rustage	—	Non-album singles
"The Speed in My Soul"	2020	Hyper Potions	—	Non-album singles
"The Friendly Long Horse"	2020	—	—	Non-album singles
"Failure to Success"	2020	—	—	Non-album singles
"Get Stickbugged Lol" (remix)	2020	—	—	Non-album singles
"You Have Been Distracted" (remix)	2020	—	—	Non-album singles
"The Baddest" (cover)	2020	—	—	Non-album singles
"Never Grow Up"	2020	Vannamelon	—	Non-album singles
"Show Yourself"	2020	—	—	Non-album singles
"I'ma Walk Right In"	2020	—	—	Non-album singles
"Superstitious Foundation"	2020	—	—	Non-album singles
"Feelin' Tired"	2020	—	—	Non-album singles
"Lyin' 2 Me"	2020	—	—	Non-album singles
"30 Christmas Songs in 1 Minute"	2020	—	—	Non-album singles
"I See a Dreamer"	2021	—	—	Non-album singles
"Dear Calypso"	2021	Muircat	—	Non-album singles
"Good to Be Alive"	2021	—	—	Non-album singles
"I Get Sick of Love"	2021	—	—	Non-album singles
"Sleeping in the Nether"	2021	—	—	Non-album singles
"Gone Away"	2021	—	—	Non-album singles
"They Feast Tonight"	2021	—	—	Non-album singles
"How to Be an Eggdog"	2021	—	—	Non-album singles
"Monday Morning"	2021	Chi-Chi, DHeusta, Nenorama, OR3O, Dolvondo, Kathy-Chan, Djsmell, Geniune	—	Non-album singles
"Improvising"	2021	Lollia	—	Non-album singles
"Tommy Innit"	2021	—	—	Non-album singles
"Phoenix of the Sea"	2021	—	—	Non-album singles
"OK Friday"	2021	Annapantsu, Rustage	—	Non-album singles
"Wonderland"	2021	—	—	Non-album singles
"Vibrant Eyes"	2021	—	—	Non-album singles
"Drop the Bass on the Stereo"	2021	—	—	Non-album singles
"Freak Out"	2021	—	—	Non-album singles
"Ocean Blue"	2021	Precious Jewel Amor	—	Non-album singles
"Poison Blooms"	2021	—	—	Non-album singles
"Inspector Royale"	2021	—	—	Non-album singles
"Christmas Dreams"	2021	—	—	Non-album singles
"Injustice"	2021	—	—	Non-album singles
"Why Did the Chicken Cross the Road"	2021	—	—	Non-album singles
"Sparkly Abs"	2021	CaptainSparklez	—	Non-album singles
"MrBeast Theme Song" (remix)	2022	—	—	Non-album singles
"Lonely King"	2022	—	—	Non-album singles
"Strangest Thing"	2022	—	—	Non-album singles
"Bred to Be Bad"	2022	—	—	Non-album singles
"Mommy's Here"	2022	Elsie Lovelock, Nola Klop	—	Non-album singles
"Noot Noot"	2022	—	—	Non-album singles
"The NFT Man"	2022	—	—	Non-album singles
"I Fall Apart Sometime"	2022	OR3O	—	Non-album singles
"Superstar"	2022	—	—	Non-album singles
"Devil"	2022	—	—	Non-album singles
"Ben"	2022	—	—	Non-album singles
"Bite of 87"	2022	Abdul Cisse	—	Non-album singles
"Run"	2022	—	—	Non-album singles
"Halls"	2022	—	—	Non-album singles
"Minion"	2022	Salem Ilese	—	Non-album singles
"Glamorous"	2022	—	—	Non-album singles
"Goosebumps"	2022	Dan Bull	—	Non-album singles
"Only in Ohio"	2022	—	—	Non-album singles
"Children of the Machine"	2023	DAGames	—	Non-album singles
"Death"	2023	—	—	Non-album singles
"4Get"	2023	OR3O, The Living Tombstone	—	Non-album singles
"Out of My Mind"	2023	—	—	Non-album singles
"Jump Around"	2023	—	—	Non-album singles
"IDon'tUnderstand"	2023	David Archuleta	—	Non-album singles
"Pied Piper"	2023	Kathy-Chan	—	Non-album singles
"Superhero"	2023	—	—	Non-album singles
"Grimace"	2023	DHeusta, Djsmell	68	Non-album singles
"THX"	2023	—	—	Non-album singles
"Ruined Lullaby"	2023	—	—	Non-album singles
"Bro"	2023	—	—	Non-album singles
"Live Laugh Lie"	2023	—	—	Non-album singles
"Napoleon"	2023	—	—	Non-album singles
"Ballad of the Walking Machines"	2023	JT Music	—	Non-album singles
"Anything Can Go"	2023	Djsmell, Kathy-Chan	—	Non-album singles
"High"	2024	—	—	Non-album singles
"Sleep Well"	2024	Chi-Chi, Kathy-Chan, Cami-Cat	56	Non-album singles
"Sleep Well" (live)	2024	—	—	Non-album singles
"Forbidden Feeling"	2024	—	—	Non-album singles
"Somebody Real"	2024	—	—	Non-album singles
"Repair Me"	2024	—	—	Non-album singles
"Listen to the Music"	2024	—	—	Non-album singles
"Crawl"	2024	—	—	Non-album singles
"Fairytale Expedition"	2024	—	—	Non-album singles
"Freddy" (Note: Single was released in celebration of the franchise's 10-year anniversary.)	2024	Black Gryph0n, MatPat	—	Non-album singles
"OCD"	2024	—	—	Non-album singles
"Let Me In"	2024	Allanah Fitzgerald, Michael Kovach	—	Non-album singles
"Cherish in the Dark"	2024	—	—	Non-album singles
"Finding Maria"	2024	—	—	Non-album singles
"U Move"	2025	—	—	Project U Move
"LaLaLove"	2025	Kyle Exum	—	Project U Move
"Hell Like This"	2025	—	—	Non-album singles
"Break Out the Box"	2025	My Singing Monsters	—	Non-album singles
"Hold the Mine"	2025	—	—	Non-album singles
"Imitation"	2025	—	—	Non-album singles
"Your Idol" (CG5 version)	2025	Silva Hound	—	Non-album singles
"Join Us for a Bite" (CG5 version)	2025	JT Music	—	Non-album singles
"Got It Maid" (CG5 version)	2025	Glitch Whisper	—	Non-album singles
"Ethereal Workshop" (2025 edition)	2025	My Singing Monsters, Landen Purifoy	—	Non-album singles
"Child Wielding Needle"	2025	—	—	Non-album singles
"I'm Not an Egg" (with Steak)	2025	Steak (streamer)	—	Non-album singles
"Locked Away"	2025	BlushCrunch Studios	—	Non-album singles
"1 of Us"	2025	Glitch Whisper	—	Non-album singles
"Wrong Side Out"	2026	—	21	Non-album singles
"Lover Without a Heart"	2026	Lizzie Freeman	—	Non-album singles
"Crumbled Crown"	2026	Devsisters	—	Non-album singles
"Fly"	2026	Max Cooper III	—	Non-album singles
"Not Supposed to Love Me"	2026	—	—	Non-album singles
"I Don't Like You"	2026	—	—	Gamer
"Masquerade Party"	2026	—	—	Non-album single
"Fanatic"	2026	—	—	Gamer
"Go Go Go"	2026	Ironmouse	—	Gamer
"Your Verity"	2026	Horror Skunx	—	Non-album single
"Race to Win"	2026	—	—	Gamer
"I'm The Big Bad"	2026	Joie Bianco	—	Non-album single
"—" denotes a recording that did not chart or was not released in that country.

==== As featured artist ====
Title	Year	Artist	Peak chart positions	Credits
Title	Year	Artist	UK	Credits
"I Walk Ahead of You" (McGwire and CG5 remix)	2026	The Living Tombstone	—	Vocals
"The 6 7 Song" (remix)	2026	Lil Godd	—	Feature
"Caper of the Bells"	2025	Random Encounters	—	Feature
"Mess I Made"	2025	RudyWade	—	Feature
"Golden Eyes"	2025	Silva Hound	—	Producer, vocals
"The Cereal Cypher"	2025	The Stupendium	—	Feature
"Welcome to the End of tThe World"	2025	Longestsoloever	—	Feature
"This Is What Heartbreak Feels Like" (CG5 edition)	2025	Jvke	—	Feature
"Music Box"	2025	Faze Music	—	Feature
"No Exit"	2024	MilkyyMelodies	—	Feature
"Answer from U"	2024	RudyWade	—	Feature
"I Need a Friend"	2024	Dallin Haymore	—	Producer, feature
"Stuck Inside" (CG5 remix)	2023	Black Gryph0n	—	Feature
"Digital Circus"	2023	Rockit Music	—	Feature
"Randezvous"	2023	ChewieCatt	—	Feature, mixing, mastering
"ILY" (featuring CG5)	2023	Kirkiimad	—	Producer, feature, mixing, mastering
"Coming Back for More"	2023	DHeusta	—	Feature
"Far Away"	2023	HalaCG	—	Feature
"Ruins" (featuring CG5)	2023	Chris Hudson	—	Feature
"Euphoria"	2023	GameboyJones	—	Feature
"Grow Up"	2023	Sam Haft	—	Vocals
"Give a Little" (featuring CG5)	2023	LeGrand	—	Feature
"Vandalize" (remix/cover)	2023	VGR	—	Vocals
"I See a Dreamer" (Cover)	2023	Caleb Hyles	—	Feature
"Best Friend"	2022	Skeppy	—	Producer, feature
"Fall Guy"	2022	Sully	—	Feature
"History of TommyInnit"	2022	Fógeti	—	Feature
"It's Spreading"	2022	Dawko	—	Feature
"You'll Be in My Heart" (cover)	2022	Finn M-K	—	Feature
"Long Night"	2022	SayMaxWell	—	Feature
"I'm Glad It's Over" (featuring CG5)	2022	Vurb	—	Feature, writer
"Happy Birthday"	2022	Phyre Productions	—	Feature
"We Don't Talk About Bruno" (cover)	2022	Caleb Hyles	—	Feature
"The Super Smash Bros Ultimate Cypher"	2022	NerdOut	—	Feature
"Empty Pages"	2022	Halfy and Winks	—	Feature
"Turn It Down"	2022	OR3O	—	Feature
"Drop"	2022	Rockit Music	—	Feature
"Temporary Love"	2022	The Living Tombstone	—	Vocals
"Bohemian Rhapsody" (cover)	2022	Caleb Hyles	—	Feature
"Noelle"	2021	Random Encounters	—	Feature
"Muffin"	2021	BadBoyHalo	—	Producer, writer, feature
"The Dawn"	2021	JT Music	—	Feature
"Life by the Sea"	2021	Tubbo	80	Producer, background vocals
"Out of Touch"	2021	Tia Jade	—	Feature
"Anything You Can Do" (cover)	2021	OR3O	—	Feature
"All Right There"	2021	BSlick	—	Feature
"Zero to Hero" (cover)	2021	Caleb Hyles	—	Feature
"Captain's Call"	2021	Derivakat	—	Feature
"Castaways" (cover)	2021	Annapantsu	—	Feature
"Can't Wait" (remix)	2021	The Living Tombstone	—	Vocals
"Darkest Desire"	2021	Skywarped 33	—	Feature
"No Reason to Lie"	2020	Give Heart Records	—	Feature
"Dream Island"	2020	Misha	—	Feature
"Ready as I'll Ever Be" (Cover)	2020	Caleb Hyles	—	Feature
"You've Got a Friend in Me" (cover)	2020	Kitschpit	—	Backup vocals
"Kidnap the Sandy Claws" (remix)	2020	The Story of Endigo	—	Feature
"2 Guys, 10 Songs"	2020	Roomie	—	Feature
"The Among Us Rap Battle"	2020	NerdOut	—	Producer, feature, writer
"Return by Death!"	2020	K!d W!cked	—	Feature
"Messing Up"	2020	Build a Song Workshop	—	Producer, vocals
"Trouble"	2020	HalaCG	—	Feature
"Somebody Told Me" (cover)	2020	Halocene	—	Feature
"The Fall Guy Within"	2020	NerdOut	—	Feature, writer
"Toon Catastrophes"	2020	Kyle Allen Music	—	Feature
"Jungle Hijinx with Lyrics"	2020	Man on the Internet	—	Feature
"Siren Head vs. Cartoon Cat – Rap Battle"	2020	Cam Steady	—	Feature
"Irreplaceable"	2020	IcyDaRabbit	—	Feature
"Try Everything" (rock cover)	2020	Brandi	—	Feature
"I See the Light" (cover)	2020	Beverly Thorne	—	Feature
"Stay the Course"	2020	Give Heart Records	—	Feature
"Who I Am"	2020	Cubical	—	Producer, vocals
"Doom Crossing"	2020	DHeusta	—	Producer, feature
"Timefall"	2020	Muircat	—	Feature, mixing, mastering
"Absolutely Anything" (2020 edit)	2020	Spinnin' Records	—	Vocals
"12 Days of YouTube"	2019	WarDoc	—	Feature
"Wake Up!"	2019	Chris Commisso	—	Producer, feature
"Strangers Like You" (cover)	2019	Caleb Hyles	—	Feature
"Never Ending Party"	2019	DHeusta	—	Feature
"Independent Together" (cover)	2019	Caleb Hyles	—	Feature
"Inside"	2019	Dolvondo	—	Vocals, mixing
"Señorita" (cover)	2019	OR3O	—	Feature
"Terrorize the Night"	2019	Rockit Music	—	Feature
"One Inch Wonder"	2019	Finn M-K	—	Feature
"We Are The Phantoms" (remix)	2019	Axie	—	Vocals
"The Truth"	2019	Coda	—	Vocals
"What I'm Made Of"	2019	FamilyJules	—	Vocals
"Mean Girl"	2019	DHeusta	—	Feature
"In M87"	2019	Chi-Chi	—	Vocals
"Die House" (cover)	2019	GlitchxCity	—	Vocals
"La Seine"	2019	Jordan Scarzfava	—	Feature
"I Can Do Anything"	2019	JT Music	—	Producer, feature, writer
"Prove Me Wrong"	2019	Musiclide	—	Vocals
"The Miser Brothers Theme Song"	2019	WarDoc	—	Feature
"Christmas Medley"	2018	Kathy-Chan	—	Feature
"A Chapter to Unfold"	2018	DHeusta	—	Feature
"Make Your Move"	2018	Dawko	—	Producer, feature
"It's Our House Now!"	2018	WarDoc	—	Feature
"Walking Fast"	2018	KMODO	—	Feature
"Face Reality"	2018	Victor McKnight	—	Special thanks
"This Is Halloween" (cover)	2018	Endigo	—	Feature
"Trick or Treat" (remix)	2018	Dolvondo	—	Producer, vocals
"Blink of an Eye"	2018	DHeusta	—	Feature
"Ground Zero"	2018	Random Encounters	—	Feature
"I Wanna Waa"	2018	Nenorama	—	Producer, vocals, writer
"Miracle"	2018	Alicia Michelle	—	Producer, feature
"Like It or Not"	2018	Dawko	—	Producer, feature
"It's Up to You"	2018	KMODO	—	Feature
"Un Poco Loco" (cover)	2018	Hailey Lain	—	Producer, feature
"Won't Give Into Darkness"	2017	CK9C	—	Feature
"The One in Control"	2017	Rose Sapphire Music	—	Vocals
"You Signed a Contract"	2017	Fandroid	—	Mixing, backup vocals
"Cartoon Craze"	2017	KMODO	—	Vocals
"The Devil's Disco"	2017	Fandroid	—	Vocals
"Composer Struggles"	2017	Musiclide	—	Producer, vocals
"—" denotes a recording that did not chart or was not released in that country.

==== Production credits ====
Title	Year	Artist	Credits
"Team Skull" (Trap Remix)	2016	GameChops	Producer
"Jungle" (Trap Remix)	2016	GameChops	Producer
"Inkoming" (Future Bass Remix)	2017	GameChops	Producer
"Zelda" (Epic Trap Remix)	2017	GameChops	Producer
"Weird Autumn" (Remix)	2017	GameChops	Producer
"Cascade Kingdom" (remix)	2017	GameChops	Producer
"Insanity"	2018	Dolvondo	Post-production
"We Are Aware"	2018	Dolvondo	Post-production
"Time to Climb"	2018	DHeusta	Producer
"A Child Like You" (CG5 remix)	2018	HalfSkull	Producer
"Face Reality"	2018	Victor McKnight	Special thanks
"Filth Filth All Around" (extended cover)	2019	Chi-Chi	Producer
"Area 51" (CG5 remix)	2019	Chris Commisso	Producer
"Despicable Punk"	2019	SiIvaGunner	Producer
"Sleep Away"	2020	Stormy Lee	Producer
"Time to Be a Hero"	2020	Nenorama	Producer
"Sirens Calling"	2020	Dolvondo	Producer
"Carnal Urges"	2021	Nenorama	Producer
"Goodbye, Monday"	2022	Caleb Hyles	Producer
"Rising Kingdom"	2022	CaptainSparklez	Mixing, mastering
"Stranger"	2023	Stormy Lee	Producer
"I'm Psycho"	2023	ZAMination	Producer
"Leash"	2024	Stormy Lee	Producer, mixing, mastering

== Charts ==
Weekly chart performance for "Life by the Sea"
Chart (2021)	Peak position
UK Singles (Official Charts)	80

Weekly chart performance for "Grimace"
Chart (2023)	Peak position
UK Video Streaming Charts (Official Charts)	68

Weekly chart performance for "Sleep Well"
Chart (2024)	Peak position
UK Video Streaming Charts (Official Charts)	56

Weekly chart performance for "Wrong Side Out"
Chart (2026)	Peak position
UK Video Streaming Charts (Official Charts)	21

== Awards and nominations ==
Year	Award	Nominee / work	Category	Result	Ref.
2026	Webby Awards	CG5	People's Voice Award	Won	
