= Project U Move =

2025 American independent horror series

- Poster for the pilot episode, featuring CG5 and Rose with the red cassette tape at the center held by a gloved hand
- Also known as: Project You Move
- Genre: Analog horror
- Created by: Charlie Green
- Written by: William Bradford; Angie Green; Charlie Green
- Directed by: William Bradford; Charlie Green
- Starring: Charlie Green; Piper Rubio; Keanan Smock; Katherine Arana; Samantha Boubel
- Music by: Charlie Green
- Composers: Dallin Heward; Charlie Green
- Country of origin: United States
- Original language: English
- No. of episodes: 3

Production
- Producers: William Bradford; Charlie Green
- Cinematography: William Bradford; Charlie Green
- Editors: Gabe Reeves; Charlie Green

Original release
- Release: January 24 – March 21, 2025

Project U Move (stylized in all uppercase) is an American independent analog horror series created, written, directed, and composed by musician Charlie Green, better known by the stage name CG5. The series consists of 3 episodes, with all three episodes combined as a horror film which was exclusively screened at the Fine Arts Theatre at Beverly Hills, Los Angeles.

== Synopsis ==
Project U Move follows the multiple victims of a mysterious red cassette tape that haunts anyone who plays it.

== Promotion and release ==
Project U Move was teased on December 31, 2024, at the end of a New Year's Eve livestream in CG5's YouTube channel. At the end of the live stream, a pre-recorded video is transitioned revealing the name and release date of the series and Piper Rubio starring as a character.

The first part was released on January 24, 2025, with its accompanied single "U Move" releasing on January 31, 2025. The second part was released on February 21, 2025, with its accompanied single "LALALove" releasing on February 28, 2025. The final part was released on March 21, 2025, with the whole EP releasing on March 28, 2025. A music video for the track "Entranced" was also released.

== Characters ==
- CG5 (Charlie Green), a fictionalized version of the artist, who is the first in the series to be a victim of the cassette tape, triggering the events of the series.
- Rose (Piper Rubio), the little girl who becomes the next victim after CG5.
- Jessie (Keanan Smock), part of the vlogging duo behind J&K’s Camper of Dreams, and is the next victim after Rose.
- Sam (Katherine Arana), Jessie's partner and co-host of the vlog.
- Samantha (Samantha Boubel), a woman who received a warning video from CG5 about the VHS. After microwaving the cassette tape, it malfunctions and takes her home, leaving her homeless.

=== Supporting characters ===
- Dallin Heward (himself)
- Thomas Lofgreen (himself)
- Emma Green (herself)
- Rose's mother (Bonnie Hawkes)
- Rose's father (William Bradford (director))
- News reporter (Joe Dana)
- Young boy (Lucas Grant)
- Young girl (Arabella Grant)
- Noah Glenn Charter (cameo)
- Nolan "Steak" Crait (cameo)
- Hyperstrides (cameo)
- Terminally Silly (cameo)
- Tyler "Jimmy Here" Collins (cameo)
- Forrest "KreekCraft" Waldron (cameo)
- Titus Biafore (cameo)
- Dawko (cameo)
- Daniel Thrasher (cameo)
- Chuck Green (cameo)
- Carson Coombs (cameo)
- London Coombs (cameo)
- Leila Collins (cameo)
- Richard "RichaadEB" Bichler (cameo)
- June Bradford (cameo)
- Trudy Bradford (cameo)
- Tess Bradford (cameo)
- DJ Cutman (cameo)
- Dylan Parker "YuB" Russell (cameo)
- Ryan "8-BitRyan" (cameo)
- Russell "Rockit Music" McKamey (cameo)
- Caleb Hyles (cameo)
- Gabe Reeves (cameo)
- Lewberger (cameo)
- Greg "The Stupendium" Holgate (cameo)
- Jonathan "ShadyPenguinn" Indovino (cameo)
- Nathan "NateWantsToBattle" Sharp (cameo)
- Mason "UniqueGeese" Myers (cameo)
- Chi-Chi (cameo)
- RudyWade (cameo)
- Roomie (cameo)
- Elise Ecklund (cameo)
- Jake "Jakeneutron" Sloan (cameo)
- Jason Linford (cameo)
- Jeffrey Linford (cameo)

== Episodes ==
No.	Title	Directed by	Written by	Original release date
1	"Part 1"	CG5 & William Bradford	CG5, William Bradford & Angie Green	24 January 2025
CG5 live streams on New Year's Eve. As midnight strikes, however, his stream inexplicably goes dark, and he's frustrated and confused. While poking around inside his room, CG5 finds an odd cherry-red cassette tape that came to be there spontaneously. Upon playing, the tape displays a live video broadcast of his own bedroom. As he looks on, he finds himself transported inside the VHS player, and he goes missing from the real world. As he disappears, CG5's online identity begins to inexplicably vanish. Social networks are deleted, and profile pictures are substituted by an uninterrupted red screen. Online fans and friends begin to theorize where he could be. Later, its face is revealed to have been replaced by the cassette tape—digitally deleted and replaced by an empty container of his former self. Two of CG5's friends, Thomas and Dallin, are introduced talking about not seeing him, until CG5 shows up inexplicably in one of their bedrooms. The scene abruptly cuts to a splash of red, reminiscent of the visual trope that's tied to the cassette tape. In another sequence, CG5 shows up on another livestream, attempting to calm viewers down by saying "everything's fine," while intercut footage shows him frantic and disturbed, which means he may not have control over things. The story shifts to Rose, a preteen, who comes across the same red cassette tape while browsing through a local department store. Though not allowed to buy by her mother, Rose secretly puts the tape into her backpack and takes the tape from the store. When she plays the tape, she sees a music video. As the video ends, the screen goes to solid red while Rose remains rigid in terror.
2	"Part 2"	CG5 & William Bradford	CG5, William Bradford & Angie Green	21 February 2025
Directly continuing from the first episode, her parents find her and attempt to restrain her—her father even destroys the VHS player, yet still, despite cutting off the power, the red glow continues to illuminate, testifying to the supernatural hold by the tape. The second episode has the plot follow camper couple Jessie and Sam on their YouTube show J&K’s Camper of Dreams. Prospecting using a metal detector, Jessie stumbles on the red cassette tape hidden in a thorny thicket. They return the curious item to view on their RV. Another music video plays, ending once again on the familiar red screen. Jessie becomes unconscious, whereas Sam himself isn’t affected—suggesting that the tape only has an impact on the one who actually inserts it within the player. The scene leaves open the possibility that the effects from the tape may stick to specific conditions or regulations.
3	"Part 3"	CG5 & William Bradford	CG5, William Bradford & Angie Green	21 March 2025
The red cassette tape proceeds to draw more victims, with news anchors advising people to avoid it at all costs and streaming services temporarily shutting down from its increased scope. In one last hope, CG5 makes an emergency video about the tape, which gets found by Samantha. When she receives the cassette tape, she microwaves and leaves the house, which in return destroys the house leaving her homeless. As more victims are drawn, the final step is initialized, introducing us to a fake CG5 introducing its victims with an uncanny persuasive video about "Project U Move".

== Extended play soundtrack ==
PROJECT U MOVE

EP by CG5
- Released: March 28, 2025
- Recorded: 2022–2025
- Genre: Pop
- Length: 18:08
- Language: English
- Label: Virgin Music Group
- Producer: CG5

CG5 chronology
Hell Like This (single) (2025)	PROJECT U MOVE (2025)	Break Out The Box (single) (2025)

Singles from PROJECT U MOVE
- 1. "U MOVE" Released: January 31, 2025; 2. "LALALove" Released: February 28, 2025; 3. "Entranced" Released: March 28, 2025

The series contains 6 original tracks under the extended play of the same name. Each episode shows a snippet of one of the songs in the extended play. Leitmotifs of songs are played during parts in the series.

PROJECT U MOVE track list
No.	Title	Length
1.	"U MOVE"	3:02
2.	"A Little Change"	2:46
3.	"LALALove"	2:33
4.	"Lifesaver"	2:36
5.	"Sunrise"	3:31
6.	"Entranced"	3:40
Total length:		18:08

=== Personnel ===
- Charlie Green - lead vocals, composer, production, writer, editor
- Kyle Exum - vocals (3)
- Dolvondo - composer (1)
- Marshall Mabee - composer (1)
- Christopher Davidsson - composer (4)
- Dwayne Shippy - writer (4, 6)
- DJ Cutman - producer (4)

Additional musicians

- Tom Billington - guitar (2)
- Tom Lofgreen - saxophone (5)
- Max Cooper - piano (5)
- Richard Bichler - guitar (6)
