= Misery (Pupsies song) =

Single by Pupsies
- Released: March 18, 2026
- Length: 2:46
- Label: Norgates
- Songwriters: Goetia; Ella Kamgaing
- Producer: Goetia

"Misery" (stylized as "misery.") is a song by the American singer Pupsies. It was released on March 18, 2026, and went viral on TikTok in the months following its release.

== Background ==
Pupsies began creating music in 2023, at the age of 16, via SoundCloud. Pupsies' rise is closely connected to the Internet, stating that "we've come to a position in society where the Internet is so intertwined with the real world".

== Composition and lyrics ==
According to writer Andrew Unterberger of Billboard, "Misery" is a "digi-pop" song. It features a throbbing synth bass and electronic sound effects reminiscent of video games, along with sad lyrics delivered in Auto-Tuned, moaning vocals. The lo-fi production features keyboards described as 'buzzy' and 'perky,' and distorted guitars. The New York Times categorized the song as a singsong "homemade hyper-pop" revolving around "unrequited love". The track's chorus is compared to a nursery rhyme due to its repetition. The last verse noncommittally yearns for healing.

== Reception and virality ==
Upon release, the song became widely used on TikTok. It soundtracked emotional videos and anime edits, subsequently helping the song gain popularity and earn millions of streams. "Misery" has also been featured in numerous mash-ups alongside "Meant to Be" by the artist Cuntsniffer, a similar song. Sean Ross of RadioInsight described the track as a "TikTok phenomenon," featuring elements of a typical divisive song. TikTok users have jokingly referred to "Misery" as a "larp" song.

== Charts ==
Chart performance for "Misery"
Chart (2026)	Peak position
Austria (Ö3 Austria Top 40)	67
Canada Hot 100 (Billboard)	52
Czech Republic Singles Digital (ČNS IFPI)	46
Germany (GfK)	92
Germany Dance (GfK)	11
Global 200 (Billboard)	109
Ireland (IRMA)	91
Lithuania (AGATA)	33
Slovakia Singles Digital (ČNS IFPI)	82
Sweden Heatseeker (Sverigetopplistan)	12
Sweden Dance (Sverigetopplistan)	12
UK Singles (Official Charts)	61
UK Independent (Official Charts)	12
US Billboard Hot 100	50
US Hot Dance/Pop Songs (Billboard)	5
