= Pupsies =

American singer (born 2006 or 2007)

- Born: Cindy Kamgaing; 2006 or 2007 (age 19–20); North Carolina
- Genres: Digicore; hyperpop; scenecore
- Occupation: Singer
- Years active: 2023–present

Cindy Kamgaing (born 2006 or 2007), known professionally as Pupsies (stylized in all lowercase), is an American singer. She became known for her song "Misery" in 2026.

== Life and career ==
Kamgaing was born in North Carolina in 2006 or 2007. She began uploading songs to SoundCloud in 2023, soon gaining a following. On March 18, 2026, she released the single "Misery", which went viral and reached number 50 on the Billboard Hot 100. TikTok users jokingly referred to "Misery" as a "larp" song. Sean Ross of RadioInsight thought it was "obnoxious", comparing it to other songs that have been popular but divisive. Jon Pareles of The New York Times listed the song as one of the "9 Songs We're Talking About This Week" in July.

== Artistry ==
Kamgaing's genre is often classified as hyperpop and digicore. Matt Collar of AllMusic described her lyrics as "confessional" and "diary-like" and added that she "often uses anime imagery to represent herself". Similarly, Stuart Dredge of Music Ally described her as a "DIY artist," discussing her "raw, diary-entry" lyrics.

== Discography ==
Studio albums

- I Took Too Many Ibuprofen (2024)
