= The Living Tombstone =

Electronic rock duo

- Sam Haft (left) and Yoav Landau (right) in 2025

Background information
- Origin: Israel; United States
- Genres: Alternative rock; geek rock; electronic rock; pop rock; nerdcore; EDM
- Works: Discography
- Years active: 2011–present
- Labels: Ghost Pixel; 10K; Warner; Screenwave
- Members: Yoav Landau; Sam Haft
- Website: thelivingtombstone.com

YouTube information
- Channel: TheLivingTombstone
- Subscribers: 9.33 million
- Views: 4.404 billion
- Last updated: October 25, 2026

The Living Tombstone (TLT) is an electronic rock group and YouTube channel. Originally founded as a solo project by Israeli–American producer Yoav Landau (Hebrew: יואב לנדאו) in 2011, later becoming a musical duo in 2016 with American singer Sam Haft, the group is notable for their songs based on video games and pop culture media, such as My Little Pony, Five Nights at Freddy's, and Overwatch as well as original music. Signed to Warner Music, they have released two studio albums, Zero One (2020) and Rust (2025).

Several of their songs have garnered online popularity, and they have been credited with spawning various internet memes. In addition to their music videos, they have created music for the video games In Sound Mind, Beat Saber, and have created the video game AudioClash: Battle of the Bands. Music publication NME has referred to them as "the internet's biggest gaming band". (Note: "When someone mentions 'passionate' online communities in 2021, you may find yourself recoiling in horror. Yet, as the calming smiles of Yoav Landau and Sam Haft populate my Zoom window, I'm reminded of the early 2000s – and friendlier fandoms. Listening to the excitable duo reminisce about their formative years, it's hard not to think that these very online pals could be any message-board-lurking '90s kids. Except they're not – they're the internet's biggest gaming band.")

== Career ==
=== Background ===
Logo used since 2014

Yoav Landau (born April 4, 1992) is an Israeli–American musician and producer. Originally from Tel Aviv, Landau founded the Living Tombstone in 2011 as both a YouTube channel and a musical project and was involved in the online fan community of the media franchise My Little Pony, where he created remixes of the songs featured on My Little Pony: Friendship Is Magic. After one of his remixes garnered several thousand views, Landau created more songs of the franchise before eventually shifting his focus to various video game communities, creating songs based on video games.

Five years after forming the Living Tombstone, Landau moved to the United States where he met vocalist Sam Haft (born 1990). Haft had previously been involved with other musical projects in the past, such as the comedic music group Sam & Bill. Landau and Haft sent each other their songs before eventually collaborating on music, with Haft becoming an official member of the Living Tombstone. The pair wrote songs such as a remix of Super Mario Odyssey's "Jump Up Superstar" in which Haft contributed backing vocals, and the original track "My Ordinary Life" which was cited by LA Weekly as their most popular song. Both Landau and Haft worked on the worldbuilding for the Living Tombstone, including the characters, story, and lore surrounding the group's music and videos. The attention their music received online caused Warner Music to notice the band, and the record label signed the Living Tombstone.

=== Content and musical style ===
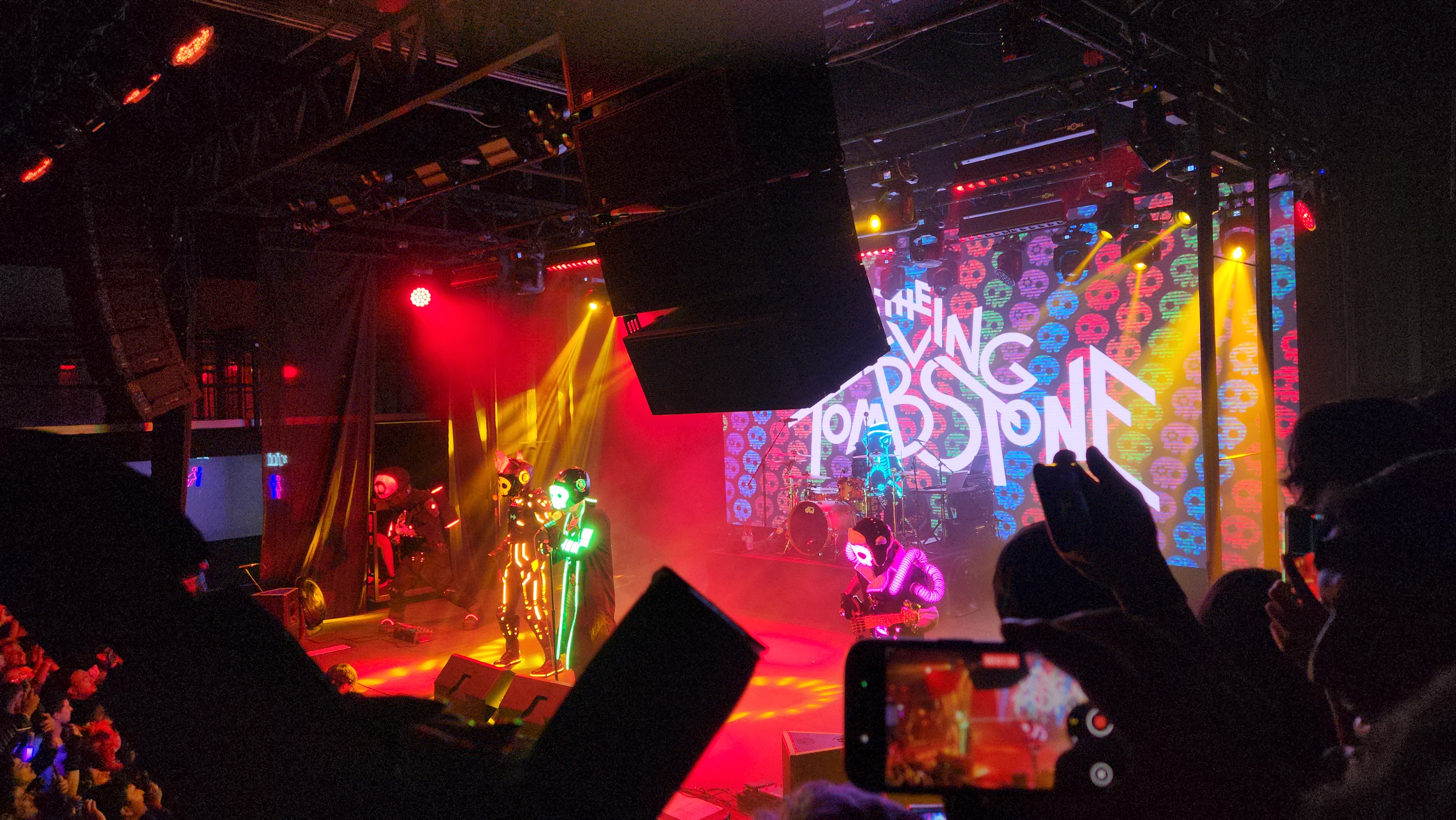
The Living Tombstone performing at the C4 Concert House in Mexico

The Living Tombstone's content consists of both original music and homages to various video games and pop culture media, several of which became popular online. One of the group's first video game-related videos was a trilogy of songs for the first three games in the Five Nights at Freddy's series. The trilogy went viral on YouTube with each song accumulating hundreds of millions of views; the first video in the series reached over 68 million views by 2016 and over 372 million views by 2024. Houston Press listed the trilogy as one of the best songs based on the horror game. The trilogy's success led the band to develop a cult following amongst the game's fandom. Rolling Stone credited the band with launching a subgenre of Five Nights at Freddy's themed music inspired by hyper-pop. The first song was later used for the 2023 film adaptation in the credits, likewise for the second song in the film's sequel in 2025. Shortly before the film's release, the band released a gothic remix of the first song. After the film's release, the song reached the top 5 of Billboard's Dance/Electronic Songs chart, peaking at #4, previously only charting on the Dance/Electronic Digital Song Sales chart.

In 2018, the Living Tombstone's song based on the 2016 hero shooter game Overwatch, "No Mercy", went viral on social media. Originally released as an animated video from YouTube channel Mashed in January 2017, the song describes two players on the same team arguing about their choice of characters and its contributions to the team's repeated losses, mainly due to the lack of a support character in the team. (Note: In Overwatch, a player may only choose one hero character in the team at a time. Support characters generally serve the role of healing other characters in the game, and have been described as "a role male players usually assign to women (or assume that women prefer)" according to Polygon.) The song features the refrain "I'm Already Tracer," which became the subject of numerous videos made on social media platform TikTok in which users recorded themselves lip-synching to the song. The meme attracted negative attention as it was the subject of various "cringe" compilations on social media. Outlets such as Kotaku, Polygon and The Daily Dot noted that such compilations soon became rooted in misogyny, with comments disparaging those who created such videos miming to the song alongside mocking women who play video games in general. Gita Jackson of Kotaku also offered criticism for the song's production and vocals; however, she noted its catchy melody and relatable lyrics.

Other songs of theirs that have become viral include their remix of various My Little Pony songs and a remix of "Spooky, Scary Skeletons". In 2012, the Living Tombstone remixed the song "Discord" from the Eurobeat producer Odyssey/Eurobeat Brony, which accumulated over 40 million views on YouTube and was used in over 500,000 videos on TikTok in 2021. In 2013, Landau made a remix of Andrew Gold's 1996 song "Spooky, Scary Skeletons," which garnered over 90 million views on YouTube. The remix was also listed by The Daily Dot as one of the most popular songs of 2019 on TikTok, and as one of the best Halloween songs by USA Today. The band also created another remix of Gold's "Witches, Witches, Witches" song in 2023, which was released on a new vinyl pressing of Gold's album Halloween Howls: Fun & Scary Music.

The group's music has been labeled as electronic rock, alternative rock and pop rock, with influences from EDM and Middle Eastern folk music. Landau has also stated that genres such as complextro, dubstep, drum 'n bass and electroswing have inspired the band's musical style. The band has been regarded as an audiovisual project. Their music and aesthetics have been compared to Gorillaz and Daft Punk, along with Lindsey Stirling's videos.

The group has two studio albums; Zero One, released on September 4, 2020, and Rust, released on May 30, 2025. For Zero One, music videos were released for the three singles that supported the album, including a CG-based music video for their song "Chosen" created by animation studio The-Artery during the COVID-19 pandemic. On January 31, 2025, the band announced their sophomore album's lead single "Be Alone" would release on February 7. While initially being announced for a 2024 release, Rust was released on May 30, 2025.

=== Game development ===
The Living Tombstone has also contributed music for video games. In 2021, the band created the soundtrack for the indie horror game In Sound Mind from Israeli game studio We Create Stuff. Their contributions to the soundtrack were praised alongside the game, with several outlets noting that the poignant and reserved compositions added to the dark atmosphere of the game. The same year, the Living Tombstone collaborated with game studio Big Boat Interactive to create the music-based strategy game AudioClash: Battle of the Bands. Described as an amalgam of various rhythm games, the role-playing games Pokémon and Dota and the Scott Pilgrim comics, the gameplay consists of assembling a group of musician characters to compete against rival bands. The game was released on Steam in early access in late 2021. The group has also contributed DLC tracks to the 2019 rhythm game Beat Saber, as well as some music for the 2010 Half-Life 2 mod Nightmare House 2 and the soundtrack for its upcoming standalone remake.

== Band members ==
Current
- Yoav Landau ("zero_one") – vocals, production, programming, multiple instruments (2011–present)
- Sam Haft ("Rust") – vocals (2016–present)
Live members
- Marcus Grimmie ("Armstrong") – lead guitar (2024–present)
- Guy Bernfield ("Tesla") – bass guitar (2024–present)
- Thomas C. Silvers ("Doc") – drums (2024–present)
- Jonathan LaMarche - bass guitar (occasional substitute for Bernfield)

== Discography ==
=== Studio albums ===
- Zero One (2020)
- Rust (2025)

== Filmography ==
=== Television ===
Year	Show	Role		Notes	Ref.
Year	Show	Yoav Landau	Sam Haft	Notes	Ref.
2017	World War Blue	—N/a	E. Vazer, Additional Voices	Sam: Voice role	
2017–21	Pokémon	—N/a	additional voices	Sam: Voice role; seasons 20-25	
2018–21	Yu-Gi-Oh! VRAINS	—N/a	Cal Koulter, Bohman		
2019	The Morose Mononokean	—N/a	Aranaki	Sam: Voice role; season 2	
2020	Akudama Drive	—N/a	Additional Voices	Sam: Voice role; 2 episodes	
2021–22	Trolls: TrollsTopia	—N/a	Smooth Jazz Chaz	Sam: Voice role; 2 episodes	
2024–present	Hazbin Hotel	—N/a	additional voices	Sam: composer	

==== Web series ====
Year	Show	Role		Notes	Ref.
Year	Show	Yoav Landau	Sam Haft	Notes	Ref.
2012	asdfmovie	—N/a	—N/a	Yoav: composer (asdfmovie5)	
2012-16	Eddsworld	—N/a	—N/a	Yoav: composer	
2013-15	TOME: Terrain of Magical Expertise	—N/a	—N/a	Yoav: composer	
2014	Skeff's Saturday	—N/a	—N/a	Yoav: composer; short	
2015-17	Gorgeous Freeman	—N/a	—N/a	Yoav: music	
2015-20	Final Fantasy VII Machinabridged	—N/a	—N/a	Yoav: theme composer	
2019–present	Helluva Boss	—N/a	—N/a	both: composers	

=== Video games ===
Year	Title	Role		Notes	Ref.
Year	Title	Yoav Landau	Sam Haft	Notes	Ref.
2017	Yu-Gi-Oh! Duel Links	—N/a	additional voices	Sam: Voice role	
2018	Pathfinder: Kingmaker	—N/a	Baron	Sam: Voice role	
2018	Super Smash Bros. Ultimate	—N/a	Scizor	Sam: Voice role	
2019	Contra: Rogue Corps	—N/a	Kurt Steiner, Hungry Beast	Sam: Voice role	
2021	Terrain of Magical Expertise	—N/a	—N/a	Yoav: composer	
2021	In Sound Mind	—N/a	Allen Shore	both: composers Sam: writer	
2023	DreamWorks Trolls Remix Rescue	—N/a	Smooth Jazz Chaz, Twin Tigers		
2026	Mewgenics	—N/a	Cats	Sam: Creature role	
TBA	Nightmare House	—N/a	—N/a	both: composers	

== Tours ==
- Tombstone Summer Tour (2024)
- TLT World Tour (2025)
- The Multiplayer Tour (2026)

== See also ==
- The Chalkeaters, a similar Russian comedy-rock band that also produces video game music on YouTube
