= In Sound Mind =

- Developer: We Create Stuff
- Publisher: Modus Games
- Director: Hen Matshulski
- Programmers: Ido Tal; Amit Arnon
- Artists: Viktor Greksa; Pedro Calvo; Evgeniy "Custom Phase" Erzutov; Joshua Culp; John Hagen
- Writers: Yair Ben-Dor; Daniel Caine; Sam Haft
- Composers: Yoav Landau; Sam Haft; Alon Meiri; Or "Orko" Cohen
- Engine: Unity
- Platforms: PlayStation 5; Windows; Xbox Series X/S; Nintendo Switch
- Release: PS5, Win, Xbox; WW: September 28, 2021; Switch; WW: October 11, 2022
- Genres: Psychological horror, Horror
- Mode: Single-player

In Sound Mind is a 2021 psychological horror game developed by We Create Stuff and published by Modus Games.

== Gameplay ==
Players control Desmond Wales, a therapist who can enter alternate dimensions when listening to tape recordings of his clients. Each of Wales' clients has their own unique level based on their fears and psychoses. Within each level, players fight monsters and solve puzzles. The ultimate goal is to solve Wales' own amnesia.

== Cast and characters ==
- Mick Lauer as Desmond Wales / Agent Rainbow
- Tiana Camacho as Tonia, Desmond's pet cat
- Hayley Nelson as Virginia Ruhl
- Sam Haft as Allen Shore
- Joshua Tomar (Note: Singing voice by Guy First) as Max Nygaard
- Luke Edward Smith (Note: Singing voice by Matan Egozi) as Lucas Cole
- Helen Laser as Rosemary James

== Development ==
The developer, Israel-based studio We Create Stuff, previously made the Half-Life 2 mod "Nightmare House 2". Modus Games released it for Windows, PlayStation 5, and Xbox Series X/S on September 28, 2021. It was ported to Switch on October 11, 2022. The electronic rock band and YouTube channel The Living Tombstone created the soundtrack for the game.

== Reception ==
Reviews

Aggregate score
Aggregator	Score
Metacritic	PC: 75/100

On Metacritic, In Sound Mind received positive reviews on Windows and Xbox Series X/S, but the PlayStation 5 version received mixed reviews. PC Gamer said it was competently made but felt it is a retread of previous psychological horror video games. Bloody Disgusting felt that In Sound Mind used familiar tropes in a better way than many other games, making it a memorable game and a solid debut.
