= DJ Cutman =

American chiptune DJ

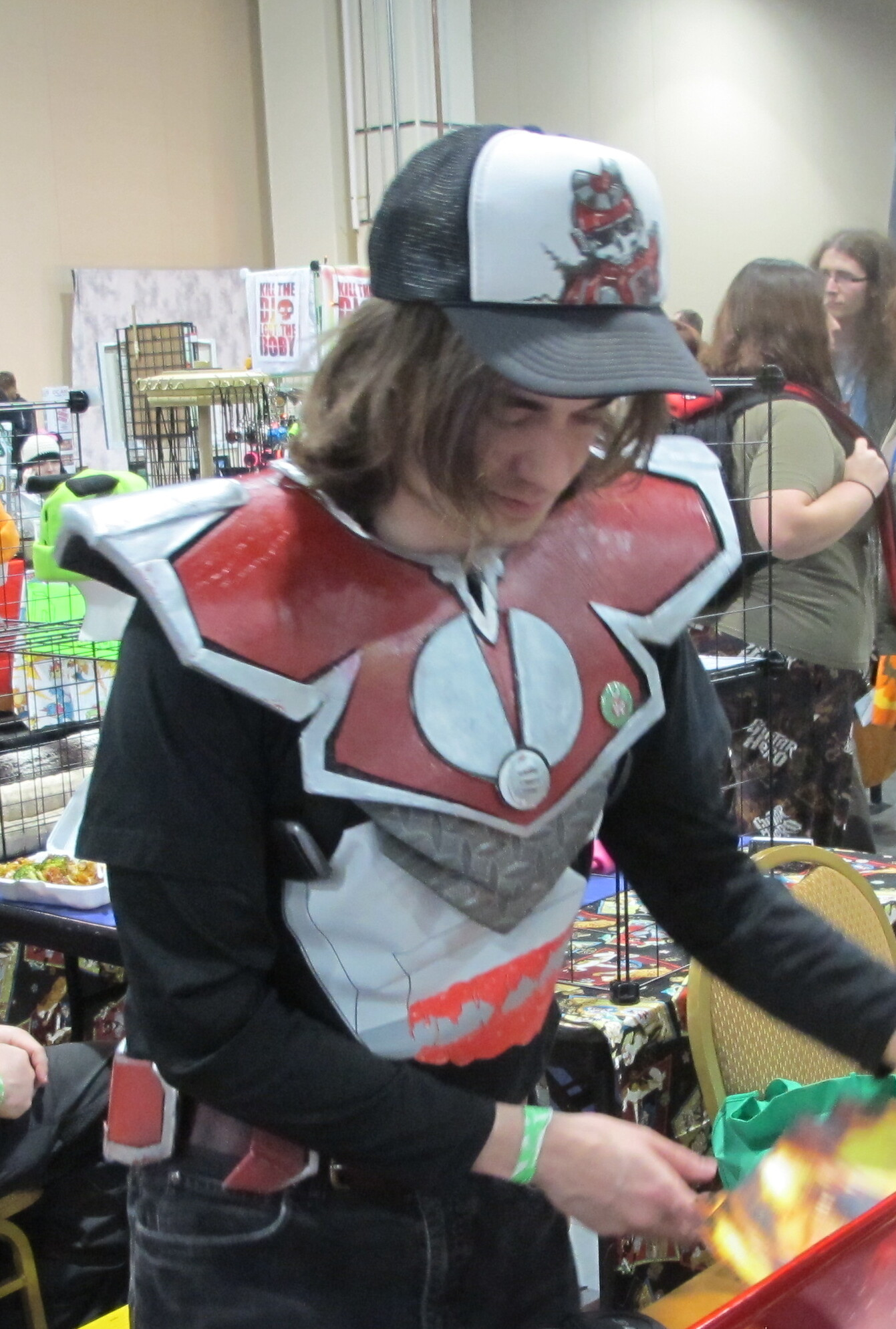
- DJ Cutman at MAGFest in 2012

Background information
- Born: Chris Davidson
- Origin: New York, New York
- Genres: Chiptune; electronic dance music; dubstep; hip-hop
- Years active: 2010–present
- Label: GameChops
- Website: music.djcutman.com

Chris Davidson, better known by his stage name DJ Cutman, is an American video game music DJ, producer and record label owner. He is known for his remixes of video game soundtracks through his label GameChops, such as Stardew & Chill, as well as his live performances at video game events and his web series This Week in Chiptune. His stage name and costume during live performances are derived from the Mega Man character Cut Man.

== Career ==
=== Origins and This Week in Chiptune (2010–2017) ===
Davidson co-owned a hip-hop studio in Ithaca, New York in the 2000s. After it was robbed in 2010, he began DJing as a coping mechanism, performing as a "high tech busker" making EDM covers of video game soundtracks. He performed live at smaller gigs and festivals in Ithaca, but struggled to do so after moving to Philadelphia. Davidson began broadcasting online instead, via Mixify and found greater success online than he had in person. He founded a small record label GameChops in 2011 to release video game covers, but struggled initially as the field was then dominated by rock bands, which focused on live performances over recordings.

He started a Patreon supported webseries "This Week in Chiptune", which ran from 2013 to 2017. During this period he would also produce cover albums, such as MeowMeow & BowWow which covered the soundtrack to The Legend of Zelda: Link's Awakening. When Twitch began allowing music streams in 2015 he switched to the platform and saw his audience triple. He continued performing live at events such as MAGfest, PAX, Otakon and Vidcon, and providing the music for the Mario Kart 8 UK championships in 2014. Davidson was among many musicians featured in the soundtrack to The Metronomicon: Slay the Dance Floor.

=== GameChops' & Chill series (2018–present) ===
Since 2018 Davidson has released a number of successful softer remixes through his GameChops label, largely collaborative endeavours with Davidson providing direction, supervision or mastering. This began with Zelda & Chill, produced by Mikel from Germany, and Mario & Chill, produced by Helynt from Italy, and developed into a longer series of mixes which were released through YouTube. While the series lacks an official name, Dualshockers suggested "The Chillogy" after the release of the third mix, Poké & Chill, in 2019. Davidson supervised the production of the album, with the composers Jun'ichi Masuda, Gō Ichinose, Minako Adachi, and Shota Kageyama also brought onto the project. PC Gamer noted the popularity of the mixes in 2022, with one journalist commenting that she had had Stardew & Chill playing on repeat every morning for a month. The latter mix was released via Bandcamp, as opposed to the others which were released through YouTube. Since 2019 Davidson has also curated chiptune releases on Spotify. By 2024 GameChops' licensed cover albums had received over a billion streams.

== Style and influences ==
When asked about his inspiration by EDM Identity, Davidson replied: "I think video game music, or any music we have heard as a child, holds a special power. As an adult, our lives are filled with all kinds of “real world” obligations like rent, groceries, etc. But through music, I feel we can revisit a time where the whole world was just us and our fantasies. It’s something very special to me." He has cited a number of influences including Daft Punk, Dr. Dre, DJ Shadow, Deadmau5, Pete Tong and Armin Van Buuren, as well as Japanese rhythm games.

== Discography ==
=== Studio albums ===
- Volume I (2011)
- Bagu and the Riverman (2011, with Spamtron)
- WiiU Grooves (2012)
- Volume II (2012)
- MeowMeow & BowWow (2013)
- Super BREAKS Bros! (2014)
- Volume III (2015)
- Fantasy Grooves (2015)
- Miitomo Grooves (2016)
- Volume IV (2017)
- Deltarune Remixes (2018)
- 2.B.A Mixtape (2018)
- Volume V (2021)
- Stardew & Chill (2022)
- Stardew & Chill 2 (2025)

=== Live ===
- Twitch Beats (2015)

=== EPs ===
- Lofi Soul (2019)
