= Hermann Bottenbruch =

German mathematician and computer scientist (1928–2019)

- Born: 14 September 1928; Mülheim an der Ruhr
- Died: 20 May 2019 (aged 90)
- Citizenship: Germany
- Education: University of Bonn (1951)
- Known for: ALGOL 58
- Scientific career
- Fields: Mathematics; Computer science
- Workplaces: Technische Universität Darmstadt; Oak Ridge National Laboratory; Primasoft

Hermann Bottenbruch (14 September 1928 – 20 May 2019) was a German mathematician and computer scientist.

== Biography ==
Bottenbruch grew up in Mülheim an der Ruhr. Toward the end of World War II, he served as a Flakhelfer. In 1947, he began the study of mathematics at the Rheinische Friedrich-Wilhelms-Universität Bonn where he graduated in 1951. Following graduation, he joined the staff of the Institute for Applied Mathematics at the Technische Universität Darmstadt (TU Darmstadt). The institute was founded by Alwin Walther. Bottenbruch earned his doctorate there in 1957.

In the same year on Walther's recommendation he joined the international working group to develop a new programming language. This language was intended to combine then current understanding of programming languages into one standard. According to Friedrich Bauer, Bottenbruch coined the name ALGOL, at least for Germany, from the English Algorithmic Language. In 1958, the members of the working group met at the Swiss Federal Institute of Technology in Zurich (ETH Zurich), including Friedrich L. Bauer, Bottenbruch, Heinz Rutishauser, Klaus Samelson, John Backus, Charles Katz, Alan Perlis, and Joseph Henry Wegstein. The result of their deliberations was ALGOL 58.

In 1960 and 1961, Bottenbruch worked in the United States at Oak Ridge National Laboratory (ORNL). After that, he took a leading position in German industry where, among other things, he served as a specialist in the field of flue-gas stack (industrial chimney) construction. In 1994, he founded his own company, Primasoft GmbH, in the German city of Oberhausen, providing information technology consulting including databases.

== Publications ==
- Construction of command languages and their translation into the program language of Turing machines: applications of logic to advanced digital computer programming, 1957
- Proposal for a universal language for the description of computing processes. 1958. Zusammen mit Friedrich L. Bauer, Heinz Rutishauser und Klaus Samelson
- Structure and use of ALGOL 60, 1961
- Industrieschornsteine. Wirkung, Planung, Konstruktion. Tagungsleitung, Deutsche Bauindustrie. Bundesfachabteilung Feuerfest- und Schornsteinbau
- Begutachten, Sanieren und Umbauen freistehender Schornsteine in Massivbauart. Arbeitstagung, Essen 1986
