= ALGOL =

Family of programming languages

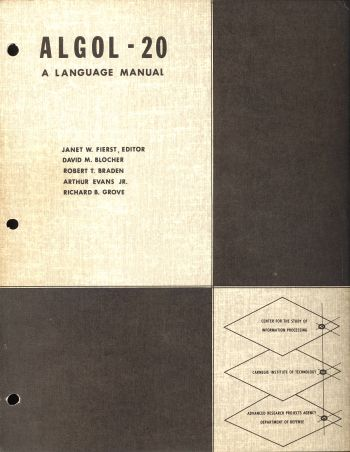
- A 1965 manual for ALGOL-20 (an implementation of ALGOL 60)
- Paradigm: Procedural, imperative, structured
- Family: ALGOL
- Designed by: Bauer, Bottenbruch, Rutishauser, Samelson, Backus, Katz, Perlis, Wegstein, Naur, Vauquois, van Wijngaarden, Woodger, Green, McCarthy
- First appeared: 1958; 68 years ago
- Typing discipline: Static, strong
- Scope: Lexical

Influenced
- Most subsequent imperative languages (including so-called ALGOL-like languages) e.g. PL/I, Simula, Pascal, C and Scheme

ALGOL (/ˈælɡɒl, -ɡɔːl/; short for "Algorithmic Language") is a family of imperative computer programming languages originally developed in 1958. ALGOL heavily influenced many other languages and was the standard method for algorithm description used by the Association for Computing Machinery (ACM) in textbooks and academic sources for more than thirty years.

In the sense that the syntax of most modern languages is "Algol-like", it was arguably more influential than three other high-level programming languages among which it was roughly contemporary: FORTRAN, Lisp, and COBOL. It was designed to avoid some of the perceived problems with FORTRAN and eventually gave rise to many other programming languages, including PL/I, Simula, BCPL, B, Pascal, Ada, and C.

ALGOL introduced code blocks and the begin...end pairs for delimiting them. It was also the first language implementing nested function definitions with lexical scope. Moreover, it was the first programming language to give detailed attention to formal language definition and, through the Algol 60 Report, it introduced Backus–Naur form, a principal formal grammar notation for language design.

There were three major specifications, named after the years they were first published:

- ALGOL 58 – originally proposed to be called IAL, for International Algebraic Language.
- ALGOL 60 – first implemented as X1 ALGOL 60 in 1961. Revised 1963.
- ALGOL 68 – introduced new elements including flexible arrays, slices, parallelism, operator identification. Revised 1973.

ALGOL 68 is substantially different from ALGOL 60 and was not well received, so reference to "Algol" is generally understood to mean ALGOL 60 and its dialects.

== History ==
ALGOL was developed jointly by a committee of European and American computer scientists in a meeting in 1958 at the Swiss Federal Institute of Technology in Zurich (cf. ALGOL 58). It specified three different syntaxes: a reference syntax, a publication syntax, and an implementation syntax, syntaxes that permitted it to use different keyword names and conventions for decimal points (commas vs periods) for different languages.

ALGOL was used mostly by research computer scientists in the United States and in Europe; commercial applications were hindered by the absence of standard input/output facilities in its description, and the lack of interest in the language by large computer vendors (other than Burroughs Corporation). ALGOL 60 did however become the standard for the publication of algorithms and had a profound effect on future language development.

Family tree of the Algol, Fortran and COBOL programming language dynasty

John Backus developed the Backus normal form method of describing programming languages specifically for ALGOL 58. It was revised and expanded by Peter Naur for ALGOL 60, and at Donald Knuth's suggestion renamed Backus–Naur form.

Peter Naur: "As editor of the ALGOL Bulletin I was drawn into the international discussions of the language and was selected to be member of the European language design group in November 1959. In this capacity I was the editor of the ALGOL 60 report, produced as the result of the ALGOL 60 meeting in Paris in January 1960."

The following people attended the meeting in Paris (from 11 to 16 January):

- Friedrich Ludwig Bauer, Peter Naur, Heinz Rutishauser, Klaus Samelson, Bernard Vauquois, Adriaan van Wijngaarden, and Michael Woodger (from Europe)
- John Warner Backus, Julien Green, Charles Katz, John McCarthy, Alan Jay Perlis, and Joseph Henry Wegstein (from the US).

Alan Perlis gave a vivid description of the meeting: "The meetings were exhausting, interminable, and exhilarating. One became aggravated when one's good ideas were discarded along with the bad ones of others. Nevertheless, diligence persisted during the entire period. The chemistry of the 13 was excellent."

=== Legacy ===
A significant contribution of the ALGOL 58 Report was to provide standard terms for programming concepts: statement, declaration, type, label, primary, block, and others.

ALGOL 60 inspired many languages that followed it. Tony Hoare remarked: "Here is a language so far ahead of its time that it was not only an improvement on its predecessors but also on nearly all its successors." The Scheme programming language, a variant of Lisp that adopted the block structure and lexical scope of ALGOL, also adopted the wording "Revised Report on the Algorithmic Language Scheme" for its standards documents in homage to ALGOL.

Beyond scheme, ALGOL's block structure and lexical scoping directly shaped the design of Pascal, C, Ada, and Simula. Simula, built as an extension of ALGOL 60, introduce classes and objects, making ALGOL an indirect ancestor of object-oriented programming. The Backus-Naur form notation, originally developed to describe ALGOL 58's grammar, became the standard method for formally specifying programming language syntax and remains widely used in language standards today.

== Properties ==
ALGOL 60 as officially defined had no I/O facilities; implementations defined their own in ways that were rarely compatible with each other. In contrast, ALGOL 68 offered an extensive library of transput (input/output) facilities.

ALGOL 60 allowed for two evaluation strategies for parameter passing: the common call-by-value, and call-by-name. Call-by-name has certain effects in contrast to call-by-reference. For example, without specifying the parameters as value or reference, it is impossible to develop a procedure that will swap the values of two parameters if the actual parameters that are passed in are an integer variable and an array that is indexed by that same integer variable. Think of passing a pointer to swap(i, A[i]) in to a function. Now that every time swap is referenced, it is reevaluated. Say i := 1 and A[i] := 2, so every time swap is referenced it will return the other combination of the values ([1,2], [2,1], [1,2] and so on). A similar situation occurs with a random function passed as actual argument.

Call-by-name is known by many compiler designers for the interesting "thunks" that are used to implement it. Donald Knuth devised the "man or boy test" to separate compilers that correctly implemented "recursion and non-local references." This test contains an example of call-by-name.

ALGOL 68 was defined using a two-level grammar formalism invented by Adriaan van Wijngaarden and which bears his name. Van Wijngaarden grammars use a context-free grammar to generate an infinite set of productions that will recognize a particular ALGOL 68 program; notably, they are able to express the kind of requirements that in many other programming language standards are labelled "semantics" and have to be expressed in ambiguity-prone natural language prose, and then implemented in compilers as ad hoc code attached to the formal language parser.

== Examples and portability ==
=== Code sample comparisons ===
==== ALGOL 60 ====
(The way the bold text has to be written depends on the implementation, e.g. 'INTEGER'—quotation marks included—for integer. This is known as stropping.)

procedure Absmax(a) Size:(n, m) Result:(y) Subscripts:(i, k);
    value n, m; array a; integer n, m, i, k; real y;
comment The absolute greatest element of the matrix a, of size n by m,
    is copied to y, and the subscripts of this element to i and k;
begin
    integer p, q;
    y := 0; i := k := 1;
    for p := 1 step 1 until n do
        for q := 1 step 1 until m do
            if abs(a[p, q]) > y then
                begin y := abs(a[p, q]);
                    i := p; k := q
                end
end Absmax

Here is an example of how to produce a table using Elliott 803 ALGOL.

 FLOATING POINT ALGOL TEST'
 BEGIN REAL A,B,C,D'
 READ D'
 FOR A:= 0.0 STEP D UNTIL 6.3 DO
 BEGIN
   PRINT PUNCH(3),££L??'
   B := SIN(A)'
   C := COS(A)'
   PRINT PUNCH(3),SAMELINE,ALIGNED(1,6),A,B,C'
 END
 END'

==== ALGOL 68 ====
The following code samples are ALGOL 68 versions of the above ALGOL 60 code samples.

ALGOL 68 implementations used ALGOL 60's approaches to stropping. In ALGOL 68's case tokens with the bold typeface are reserved words, types (modes) or operators.

proc abs max = ([,]real a, ref real y, ref int i, k)real:
comment The absolute greatest element of the matrix a, of size ⌈a by 2⌈a
is transferred to y, and the subscripts of this element to i and k; comment
begin
   real y := 0; i := ⌊a; k := 2⌊a;
   for p from ⌊a to ⌈a do
     for q from 2⌊a to 2⌈a do
       if abs a[p, q] > y then
           y := abs a[p, q];
           i := p; k := q
       fi
     od
   od;
   y
end # abs max #

Note: lower (⌊) and upper (⌈) bounds of an array, and array slicing, are directly available to the programmer.

floating point algol68 test:
(
  real a,b,c,d;
   
  # printf – sends output to the file stand out. #
  # printf($p$); – selects a new page #
  printf(($pg$,"Enter d:"));  
  read(d);
   
  for step from 0 while a:=step*d; a <= 2*pi do
    printf($l$);  # $l$ - selects a new line. #
    b := sin(a);
    c := cos(a);
    printf(($z-d.6d$,a,b,c))  # formats output with 1 digit before and 6 after the decimal point. #
  od
)

=== Timeline: Hello world ===
The Hello, world program is a common example in presenting programming languages. Here, we use it to show the differences in the ALGOL languages.

==== ALGOL 58 (IAL) ====
ALGOL 58 had no standard I/O facilities.

==== ALGOL 60 family ====
Since ALGOL 60 had no standard I/O facilities, there is no portable hello world program in ALGOL.

These examples are in Burroughs Extended Algol, the first two printing on the interactive terminal they are run on. The first uses a character array, similar to C. The language allows the array identifier to be used as a pointer to the array, and hence in a REPLACE statement.

BEGIN
   FILE F(KIND=REMOTE);
   EBCDIC ARRAY E[0:11];
   REPLACE E BY "HELLO WORLD!";
   WRITE(F, *, E);
 END.

A simpler program using an inline format:

BEGIN
   FILE F(KIND=REMOTE);
   WRITE(F, <"HELLO WORLD!">);
 END.

An even simpler program using the Display statement. Its output is printed on the system console ('SPO'):

BEGIN DISPLAY("HELLO WORLD!") END.

Here is Elliott Algol, which used different characters for "open-string-quote" ( ‘ ) and "close-string-quote" ( ’ ):

program HiFolks;
 begin
    print ‘Hello world’
 end;

Below is a version from Elliott 803 Algol (A104). The standard Elliott 803 used five-hole paper tape and thus only had upper case. The code lacked any quote characters so £ (UK Pound Sign) was used for open quote and ? (Question Mark) for close quote. Special sequences were placed in double quotes (e.g£. £L?? produced a new line on the teleprinter).

  HIFOLKS'
  BEGIN
     PRINT £HELLO WORLD£L??'
  END'

The ICT 1900 series Algol I/O version allowed input from paper tape or punched card. Paper tape 'full' mode allowed lower case. Output was to a line printer. The open and close quote characters were represented using '(' and ')' and spaces by %.

  'BEGIN'
     WRITE TEXT('('HELLO%WORLD')');
  'END'

==== ALGOL 68 ====
ALGOL 68 code was published with reserved words typically in lowercase, but bolded or underlined.

begin
  printf(($gl$,"Hello, world!"))
end

In the language of the "Algol 68 Report" the input/output facilities were collectively called the "Transput".

=== Timeline of ALGOL special characters ===
The ALGOLs were conceived at a time when character sets were diverse and evolving rapidly; also, the ALGOLs were defined so that only uppercase letters were required.

1960: IFIP – The Algol 60 language and report included several mathematical symbols which are available on modern computers and operating systems, but, unfortunately, were unsupported on most computing systems at the time. For instance: ×, ÷, ≤, ≥, ≠, ¬, ∨, ∧, ⊂, ≡, ␣ and ⏨.

1961 September: ASCII – The ASCII character set, then in an early stage of development, had the \ (Back slash) character added to it in order to support ALGOL's Boolean operators /\ and \/.

1962: ALCOR – This character set included the unusual "᛭" runic cross character for multiplication and the "⏨" Decimal Exponent Symbol for floating point notation.

1964: GOST – The 1964 Soviet standard GOST 10859 allowed the encoding of 4-bit, 5-bit, 6-bit and 7-bit characters in ALGOL.

1968: The "Algol 68 Report" – used extant ALGOL characters, and further adopted →, ↓, ↑, □, ⌊, ⌈, ⎩, ⎧, ○, ⊥, and ¢ characters which can be found on the IBM 2741 keyboard with typeball (or golf ball) print heads inserted (such as the APL golf ball). These became available in the mid-1960s while ALGOL 68 was being drafted. The report was translated into Russian, German, French, and Bulgarian, and allowed programming in languages with larger character sets, e.g., Cyrillic alphabet of the Soviet BESM-4. All ALGOL's characters are also part of the Unicode standard and most of them are available in several popular fonts.

2009 October: Unicode – The ⏨ (Decimal Exponent Symbol) for floating-point notation was added to Unicode 5.2 for backward compatibility with historic Buran programme ALGOL software.

== ALGOL implementations ==
To date there have been at least 70 augmentations, extensions, derivations and sublanguages of Algol 60.

Name	Year	Author	Country	Description	Target CPU
ZMMD-implementation	1958	Friedrich L. Bauer, Heinz Rutishauser, Klaus Samelson, Hermann Bottenbruch	Germany	implementation of ALGOL 58	Z22 (later Zuse's Z23 was delivered with an Algol 60 compiler)
X1 ALGOL 60	1960 August	Edsger W. Dijkstra and Jaap A. Zonneveld	Netherlands	First implementation of ALGOL 60	Electrologica X1
Elliott ALGOL	1960s	C. A. R. Hoare	UK	Subject of the 1980 Turing Award Lecture	Elliott 803, Elliott 503, Elliott 4100 series
JOVIAL	1960	Jules Schwartz	US	A DOD HOL prior to Ada	Various (see article)
Burroughs Algol (Several variants)	1961	Burroughs Corporation (with participation by Hoare, Dijkstra, and others)	US	Basis of the Burroughs (and now Unisys MCP based) computers	Burroughs Large Systems and their midrange also.
Case ALGOL	1961	Case Institute of Technology	US	Simula was originally contracted as a simulation extension of the Case ALGOL	UNIVAC 1107
GOGOL	1961	William M. McKeeman	US	For ODIN time-sharing system	PDP-1
RegneCentralen ALGOL	1961	Peter Naur, Jørn Jensen	Denmark	Implementation of full Algol 60	DASK at Regnecentralen
Dartmouth ALGOL 30	1962	Thomas Eugene Kurtz et al.	US		LGP-30
USS 90 Algol	1962	L. Petrone	Italy		
ALGOL 60	1962	Bernard Vauquois, Louis Bolliet	France	Institut d'Informatique et Mathématiques Appliquées de Grenoble (IMAG) and Compagnie des Machines Bull	Bull Gamma 60
Algol Translator	1962	G. van der Mey and W.L. van der Poel	Netherlands	Staatsbedrijf der Posterijen, Telegrafie en Telefonie	ZEBRA
Kidsgrove Algol	1963	F. G. Duncan	UK		English Electric Company KDF9
VALGOL	1963	Val Schorre	US	A test of the META II compiler compiler	
Whetstone	1964	Brian Randell and L. J. Russell	UK	Atomic Power Division of English Electric Company. Precursor to Ferranti Pegasus, National Physical Laboratories ACE and English Electric DEUCE implementations.	English Electric Company KDF9
NU ALGOL	1965		Norway		UNIVAC
ALGEK	1965		USSR	АЛГЭК, based on ALGOL-60 and COBOL support, for economical tasks	Minsk-22
ALGOL W	1966	Niklaus Wirth	US	Proposed successor to ALGOL 60	IBM System/360
MALGOL	1966	publ. A. Viil, M Kotli & M. Rakhendi,	Estonian SSR		Minsk-22
ALGAMS	1967	GAMS group (ГАМС, группа автоматизации программирования для машин среднего класса), cooperation of Comecon Academies of Science	Comecon		Minsk-22, later ES EVM, BESM
ALGOL/ZAM	1967		Poland		Polish ZAM computer
Simula 67	1967	Ole-Johan Dahl and Kristen Nygaard	Norway	Algol 60 with classes	UNIVAC 1107
Triplex-ALGOL Karlsruhe	1967/1968		Karlsruhe, Germany	ALGOL 60 (1963) with triplex numbers for interval arithmetic	
Chinese Algol	1972		China	Chinese characters, expressed via the Symbol system	
DG/L	1972		US		DG Eclipse family of Computers
S-algol	1979	Ron Morrison	UK	Addition of orthogonal datatypes with intended use as a teaching language	PDP-11 with a subsequent implementation on the Java VM

The Burroughs dialects included special Bootstrapping dialects such as ESPOL and NEWP. The latter is still used for Unisys MCP system software.

== See also ==
- Address programming language
- Atlas Autocode
- Coral 66
- Edinburgh IMP
- ISWIM
- JOVIAL
- NELIAC
- Simula
- S-algol
- Scheme (programming language)
