= Klaus Samelson =

German mathematician and computer pioneer (1918–1980)

- Born: 21 December 1918; Strasbourg, Alsace-Lorraine
- Died: 25 May 1980 (aged 61)
- Citizenship: Germany
- Education: LMU Munich (Ph.D., 1951)
- Scientific career
- Fields: Computer science
- Workplaces: Mathematical Institute, Technical University of Munich
- Thesis: Remarks on the Theory of Unipolar Induction and Related Effects (1951)
- Doctoral advisor: Friedrich Bopp

Klaus Samelson (21 December 1918 – 25 May 1980) was a German mathematician, physicist, and computer pioneer in the area of programming language translation and push-pop stack algorithms for sequential formula translation on computers.

== Early life ==
He was born in Strasbourg, Alsace-Lorraine, and he lived in Breslau in his early childhood years. His elder brother was the mathematician Hans Samelson. Due to political circumstances, he waited until 1946 to study mathematics and physics at LMU Munich.

== Career ==
After graduating, he worked briefly as a high school teacher before he returned to university. In 1951, he completed his Doctor of Philosophy (Ph.D.) in physics with Friedrich Bopp (Fritz) with a dissertation on a quantum mechanics problem posed by Arnold Sommerfeld related to unipolar induction.

Samelson became interested in numerical analysis, and when Hans Piloty, an electrical engineer, and Robert Sauer, a professor of mathematics, began working together, he joined and got involved in early computers as a research associate in the Mathematical Institute of the Technical University of Munich.

This changed his scientific career. His first publications came from Sauer's interests dealing with supersonic speed flow and precision problems of digital computations for numerical calculations of eigenvalues.

Soon after, Samelson's strong influence began on the development of Computer Science and Informatics as a new scientific discipline. With Friedrich L. Bauer, who also had Fritz Bopp as his Ph.D. advisor, he studied the structure of programming languages to develop efficient algorithms for their translation and implementation. This research led to bracketed structures and it became clear to Samelson that this principle should govern the translation of programming languages and the run-time system with stack models and block structure. It was a fundamental breakthrough in how computer systems are modeled and designed.

Piloty, Bauer and Samelson had also worked on the design of PERM, a computer based partly on the Whirlwind I concept. By 1955, the PERM was completed and they continued work that Bauer had begun in 1951 on concepts in automatic programming.

Samelson was involved with international standards in programming and informatics, and played a key role in the design of ALGOLs 58 and 60, as a member of the International Federation for Information Processing (IFIP) IFIP Working Group 2.1 on Algorithmic Languages and Calculi, which specified, supports, and maintains the programming languages ALGOL 60 and ALGOL 68.

In 1958, he accepted a chair for mathematics at the University of Mainz, and since 1963 he held a chair at the Technical University of Munich where he and Bauer, began to develop a university curriculum for informatics and computer science. He became an editor of the journal Acta Informatica when it began in 1971.

== Selected publications ==
- Perlis, Alan Jay; Samelson, Klaus (1958). Preliminary Report: International Algebraic Language. Communications of the ACM (Report). Vol. 1. pp. 8–22.
- Samelson, Klaus; Bauer, Friedrich Ludwig (1959). "Sequentielle Formelübersetzung" [Sequential Formula Translation]. Elektronische Rechenanlagen (in German). 1 (4): 176–182.
- Dijkstra, Edsger Wybe; Heise, Willy; Perlis, Alan Jay; Samelson, Klaus (1959). "ALGOL Sub-Committee Report – Extensions". Communications of the ACM. 2 (9): 24.
- Bauer, Friedrich Ludwig; Samelson, Klaus (1959). The problem of a common language, especially for scientific numeral work (Report). IFIP Congress. pp. 120–124.
- Backus, John Warner; Bauer, Friedrich Ludwig; Green, Julien; Katz, Charles; McCarthy, John; Perlis, Alan Jay; Rutishauser, Heinz; Samelson, Klaus; Vauquois, Bernard [in French]; Wegstein, Joseph Henry; van Wijngaarden, Adriaan; Woodger, Michael (1960). Report on the Algorithmic Language ALGOL 60. Communications of the ACM (Report). Vol. 3. pp. 299–314.
- Samelson, Klaus; Bauer, Friedrich Ludwig (1960). Sequential Formula Translation, Communications of the ACM (Report). Vol. 3. pp. 76–83.
- Bauer, Friedrich Ludwig; Samelson, Klaus (April 1961). "Comments on ALGOL 60 Maintenance and Revisions". ALGOL Bulletin (12).
- Samelson, Klaus (1962). Programming Languages and their Processing (Report). IFIP Congress. pp. 487–492.
- Eickel, Jürgen [in German]; Paul, Manfred [in German]; Bauer, Friedrich Ludwig; Samelson, Klaus (1963). A Syntax Controlled Generator of Formal Language Processors. Communications of the ACM (Report). Vol. 6. pp. 451–455.
- Backus, John Warner; Bauer, Friedrich Ludwig; Green, Julien; Katz, Charles; McCarthy, John; Perlis, Alan Jay; Rutishauser, Heinz; Samelson, Klaus; Vauquois, Bernard [in French]; Wegstein, Joseph Henry; van Wijngaarden, Adriaan; Woodger, Michael; Naur, Peter (1963). Revised Report on the Algorithmic Language ALGOL 60. Communications of the ACM (Report). Vol. 6. pp. 1–17.
- Bauer, Friedrich Ludwig; Samelson, Klaus (1976) [1975-07-23 – 1975-08-02]. Language Hierarchies and Interfaces, International Summer School (Report). Marktoberdorf, Germany: Springer.
- Samelson, Klaus (1976) [1976-08-09/12]. ECI Conference 1976, Proceedings of the 1st European Cooperation in Informatics (Report). Amsterdam, Netherlands: Springer.
- Gnatz, Rupert; Samelson, Klaus (1977) [1977-10-19/21]. Methoden der Informatik für Rechnerunterstütztes Entwerfen und Konstruieren, GI-Fachtagung (Report) (in German). Munich, Germany: Springer.
- Samelson, Klaus. Entwicklungslinien in der Informatik, GI Jahrestagung 1978 (Report) (in German). pp. 132–148.
- Bauer, Friedrich Ludwig; Broy, Manfred; Dosch, Walter; Gnatz, Rupert; Krieg-Brückner, Bernd; Laut, Alfred; Luckmann, Manfred; Matzner, Thomas; Möller, Bernhard [in German]; Partsch, Helmuth; Pepper, Peter; Samelson, Klaus; Steinbrüggen, Ralf; Wirsing, Martin; Wössner, Hans (October 1981). Programming in a Wide Spectrum Language: A Collection of Examples (Report). Science of Computer Programming. Vol. 1. Elsevier. pp. 73–114.
- Samelson, Klaus; Bauer, Friedrich Ludwig (1983). "Sequential Formula Translation (Reprint)". Communications of the ACM. 26 (1): 9–13. doi:10.1145/357980.357983. S2CID 555174.
- Bauer, Friedrich Ludwig; Berghammer, Rudolf; Broy, Manfred; Dosch, Walter; Geiselbrechtinger, Franz; Gnatz, Rupert; Hangel, Erich; Hesse, Wolfgang [in German]; Krieg-Brückner, Bernd; Laut, Alfred; Matzner, Thomas; Möller, Bernhard [in German]; Nickl, Friederike; Partsch, Helmuth; Pepper, Peter; Wirsing, Martin; Wössner, Hans (1986) [1985]. The Munich Project CIP: Volume I: The Wide Spectrum Language CIP-L (Report). Vol. I. Berlin, Germany: Springer-Verlag. ISBN 3-540-15187-7.
