= ALGOL 58 =

Programming language

- Paradigm: Procedural, imperative, structured
- Family: ALGOL
- Designed by: Friedrich L. Bauer, Hermann Bottenbruch, Heinz Rutishauser, Klaus Samelson, John Backus, Charles Katz, Alan Perlis, Joseph Henry Wegstein
- First appeared: 1958; 68 years ago
- Typing discipline: Static, strong
- Scope: Lexical

Influenced by
- FORTRAN, IT, Plankalkül, Superplan, Sequentielle Formelübersetzung

Influenced
- Most subsequent imperative languages (Algol-like)

ALGOL 58, originally named IAL, is a member of the ALGOL family of computer programming languages. It was an early compromise design soon superseded by ALGOL 60. According to John Backus:

The Zurich ACM-GAMM Conference had two principal motives in proposing the IAL: (a) To provide a means of communicating numerical methods and other procedures between people, and (b) To provide a means of realizing a stated process on a variety of machines...

ALGOL 58 introduced the fundamental notion of the compound statement, but it was restricted to control flow only, and it was not tied to identifier scope in the way that Algol 60's blocks were.

== Name ==
Bauer attributes the name to Hermann Bottenbruch, who coined the term algorithmic language (algorithmische Sprache) in 1957, "at least in Germany".

== History ==
There were proposals for a universal language by the Association for Computing Machinery (ACM) and also by the German Gesellschaft für Angewandte Mathematik und Mechanik ("Society of Applied Mathematics and Mechanics") (GAMM). It was decided to organize a joint meeting to combine them. The meeting took place from May 27 to June 2, 1958, at ETH Zurich and was attended by the following people:

- Friedrich L. Bauer, Hermann Bottenbruch, Heinz Rutishauser, and Klaus Samelson (from the GAMM)
- John Backus, Charles Katz, Alan Perlis, and Joseph Henry Wegstein (from the ACM).

The language was originally proposed to be called IAL (International Algebraic Language) but according to Perlis, this was rejected as an "'unspeakable' and pompous acronym". ALGOL was suggested instead, though not officially adopted until a year later. The publication following the meeting still used the name IAL.

By the end of 1958 the ZMMD-group had built a working ALGOL 58 compiler for the Z22 computer. ZMMD was an abbreviation for Zürich (where Rutishauser worked), München (workplace of Bauer and Samelson), Mainz (location of the Z22 computer), Darmstadt (workplace of Bottenbruch).

ALGOL 58 saw some implementation effort at IBM, but the effort was in competition with FORTRAN, and soon abandoned. It was also implemented at Dartmouth College on an LGP-30, but that implementation soon evolved into ALGOL 60. An implementation for the Burroughs 220 called BALGOL evolved along its own lines as well, but retained much of ALGOL 58's original character.

ALGOL 58's primary contribution was to later languages; it was used as a basis for JOVIAL, MAD, NELIAC and ALGO. It was also used during 1959 to publish algorithms in CACM, beginning a trend of using ALGOL notation in publication that continued for many years.

=== Time line of implementations of ALGOL 58 variants ===
| Name | Year | Author | State | Description | Target CPU |
|---|---|---|---|---|---|
| ZMMD-implementation | 1958 | Friedrich L. Bauer, Heinz Rutishauser, Klaus Samelson, Hermann Bottenbruch | Germany | | Z22 |
| NELIAC | 1958 | Naval Electronics Laboratory | USA | | AN/USQ-17 |
| JOVIAL | 1960 | Jules Schwartz | USA | Was the DOD HOL prior to Ada (programming language) | Various (see article) |
| BALGOL | 1960 | Joel Merner et al. | USA | | Burroughs Corporation B220 |
| MAD | 1960 | University of Michigan | USA | | IBM 7090/7094 mainframe, then mid-1960s ported to Univac 1108 |
| Dartmouth ALGOL 30 | 1962 | Thomas Eugene Kurtz et al. - evolved into ALGOL 60 | USA | | LGP-30 |
| SUBALGOL | 1962 | Bob Braden, Lawrence M. Breed and Roger Moore, Stanford University | USA | BALGOL extension | IBM 7090 |
| ALGO | ~ | Bendix Corporation | USA | | Bendix G-15 |

== ALGOL 58's influence on ALGOL 60 ==
- IAL introduced the three-level concept of reference, publication and hardware language, and the concept of "word delimiters" having a separate representation from freely chosen identifiers (hence, no reserved words). ALGOL 60 kept this three-level concept.
- The distinction between assignment (:= representing a left-facing arrow) and the equality relation = was introduced in IAL and kept in ALGOL 60.
- Both IAL and ALGOL 60 allow arrays with arbitrary lower and upper subscript bounds, and allow subscript bounds to be defined by integer expressions.
- Both IAL and ALGOL 60 allow nesting of procedure declarations and the corresponding identifier scopes.
- The IAL report described parameter substitution in much the same terms as the ALGOL 60 report, leaving open the possibility of call by name. It is unclear if this was realized at the time.
- IAL allows numeric statement labels, that ALGOL 60 kept.
- The possibility of including non-ALGOL code within a program was already hinted at, in the context of parameters to procedures.
- Both IAL and ALGOL 60 have a switch designator, unrelated, however, to the switch statement in C and other languages.
- In-line functions of the form f(x) := x / 2; were proposed in IAL but dropped in ALGOL 60.
- IAL procedure declarations provide separate declaration lists for input and output parameters, a procedure can return multiple values; this mechanism was replaced in ALGOL 60 with the value declaration.
- Variable declarations in IAL can be placed anywhere in the program and not necessarily at the beginning of a procedure. In contrast, the declarations within an ALGOL 60 block should occur before all execution statements.
- The for-statement has the form for i:=base(increment)limit, directly resembling the loop of Rutishauser's programming language Superplan, replacing =with :=, and replacing its German keyword Für with the direct English translation for; ALGOL 60 replaced the parentheses with the word delimiters step and until, such that the previous statement instead would be i:=base step increment until limit.
- The IAL if-statement does not have a then-clause or else-clause; it rather guards the succeeding statement. IAL provides an if either-statement that cleanly allows testing of multiple conditions. Both were replaced by ALGOL's if-then construct, with the introduction of the "dangling-else" ambiguity.
- IAL provides macro-substitution with the do-statement; this was dropped in ALGOL 60.
- IAL allows one or more array subscripts to be omitted when passing arrays to procedures, and to provide any or all arguments to a procedure passed to another procedure.
- IAL's infix Boolean operators are all of the same precedence level. Exponents are indicated with paired up and down arrows, which removed any confusion about the correct interpretation of nested exponents; ALGOL 60 replaced the paired arrows with a single up-arrow whose function is equivalent to FORTRAN's **.
- The IAL report does not explicitly specify which standard functions were to be provided, making a vague reference to the "standard functions of analysis." The ALGOL 60 report has a more explicit list of standard functions.
