= DASK =

First computer in Denmark, 1957

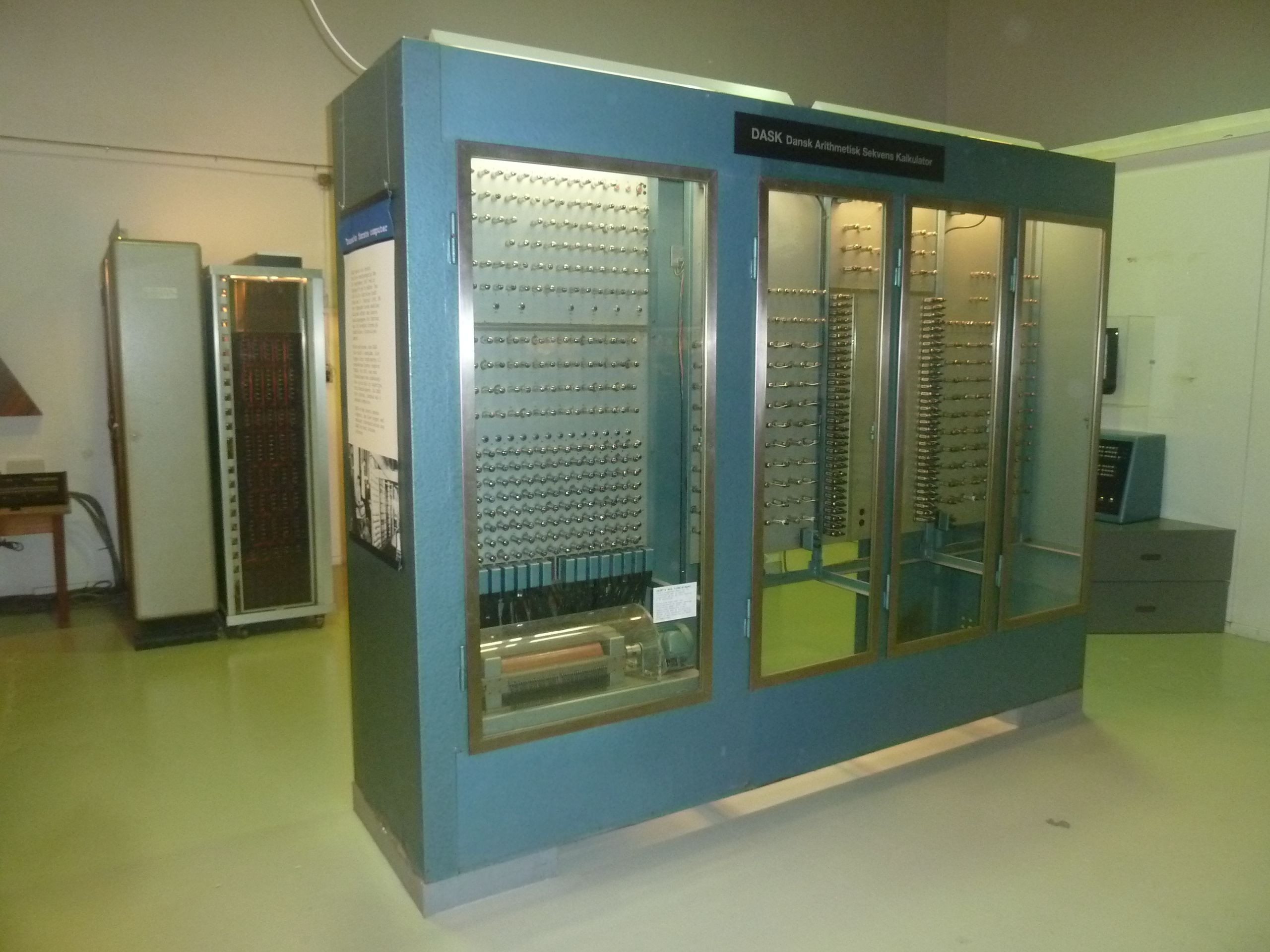
DASK in Danmarks Tekniske Museum.

The DASK was the first computer in Denmark. It was commissioned in 1955, designed and constructed by Regnecentralen, and began operation in September 1957. DASK is an acronym for Dansk Aritmetisk Sekvens Kalkulator or Danish Arithmetic Sequence Calculator. Regnecentralen almost did not allow the name, as the word dask means "slap" in Danish. In the end, however, it was named so as it fit the pattern of the name BESK, the Swedish computer which provided the initial architecture for DASK.

DASK traces its origins to 1947 and a goal set by Akademiet for de Tekniske Videnskaber (Academy for the Technical Sciences or Academy of Applied Sciences), which was to follow the development of the modern computing devices. Initial funding was obtained through the Ministry of Defence (Denmark) as the Danish military had been given a grant through the Marshall Plan for cipher machines for which the military saw no immediate need.

Originally conceived to be a copy of BESK, the rapid advancement in the field allowed improvements to be made during the development such that in the end, it was not a copy of BESK. The DASK was a one-off design that took place in a villa. The machine became so big that the floor had to be reinforced to support its mass of 3.5 metric tons.

DASK is notable for being the subject of one of the earliest ALGOL implementations, referred to as DASK ALGOL, which counted Jørn Jensen and Peter Naur among its contributors.

== Architecture ==
The DASK was a vacuum tube machine based on the Swedish BESK design. As described in 1956, it contained 2500 vacuum tubes, 1500 solid-state elements, and required a three-phase power supply of at least 15 kW.

Fast storage was 1024 40-bit words of magnetic-core memory (cycle time 5 μs), directly addressable as 1024 full words or 2048 half-words. This was complemented by an additional 8192 words of backing store on magnetic drum (spinning at 3000 rpm). A full word stored 40-bit numbers in two's-complement form, or two 20-bit instructions.

In addition to two accumulators, the DASK had three index registers, which could be used to modify the address of most instructions. An instruction word consisted of 11 bits for an address, two bits for index register selection, and seven bits for the operation code and its modifiers.

Operations included addition and subtraction (56 μs), multiplication and division (364 μs), binary shift and bitwise conjunction.

Peripherals initially included 5-bit paper tape (400 cps read time) and teletypewriter (12 cps); magnetic tape and other peripherals were added later on.

== See also ==
- List of vacuum-tube computers
