= Bendix G-15 =

Type of computer introduced in 1956

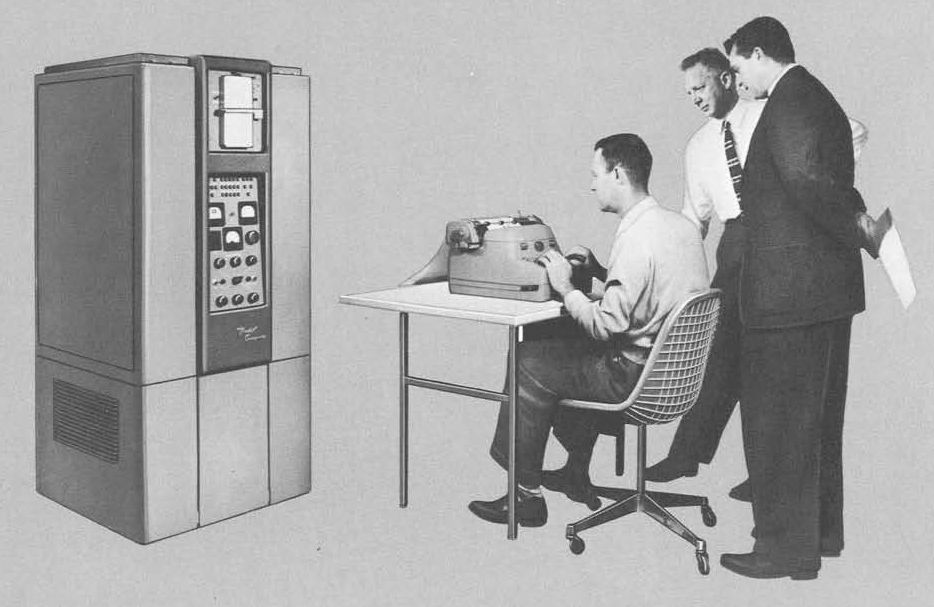
- The G15 pictured in a marketing brochure
- Developer: Harry Huskey
- Manufacturer: Bendix Corporation
- Type: computer
- Released: 1956; 70 years ago
- Introductory price: US$49,500 (Base system without peripherals)
- Discontinued: 1963
- Units sold: 400
- Dimensions: 5 by 3 by 3 ft (1.52 by 0.91 by 0.91 m)
- Weight: about 966 lb (438 kg)

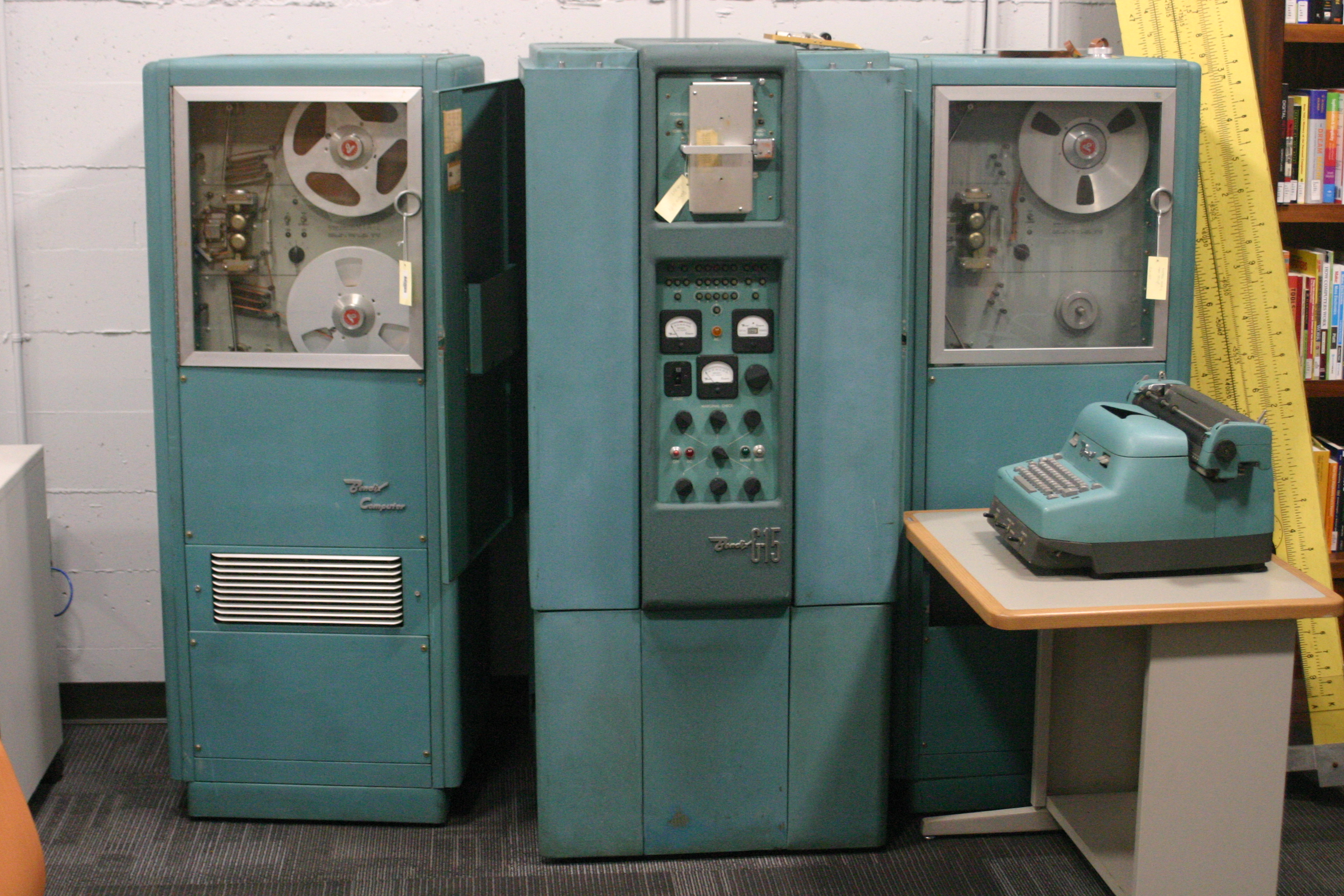
Bendix G-15 computer, 2015

Restored G-15 running at System Source Computer Museum

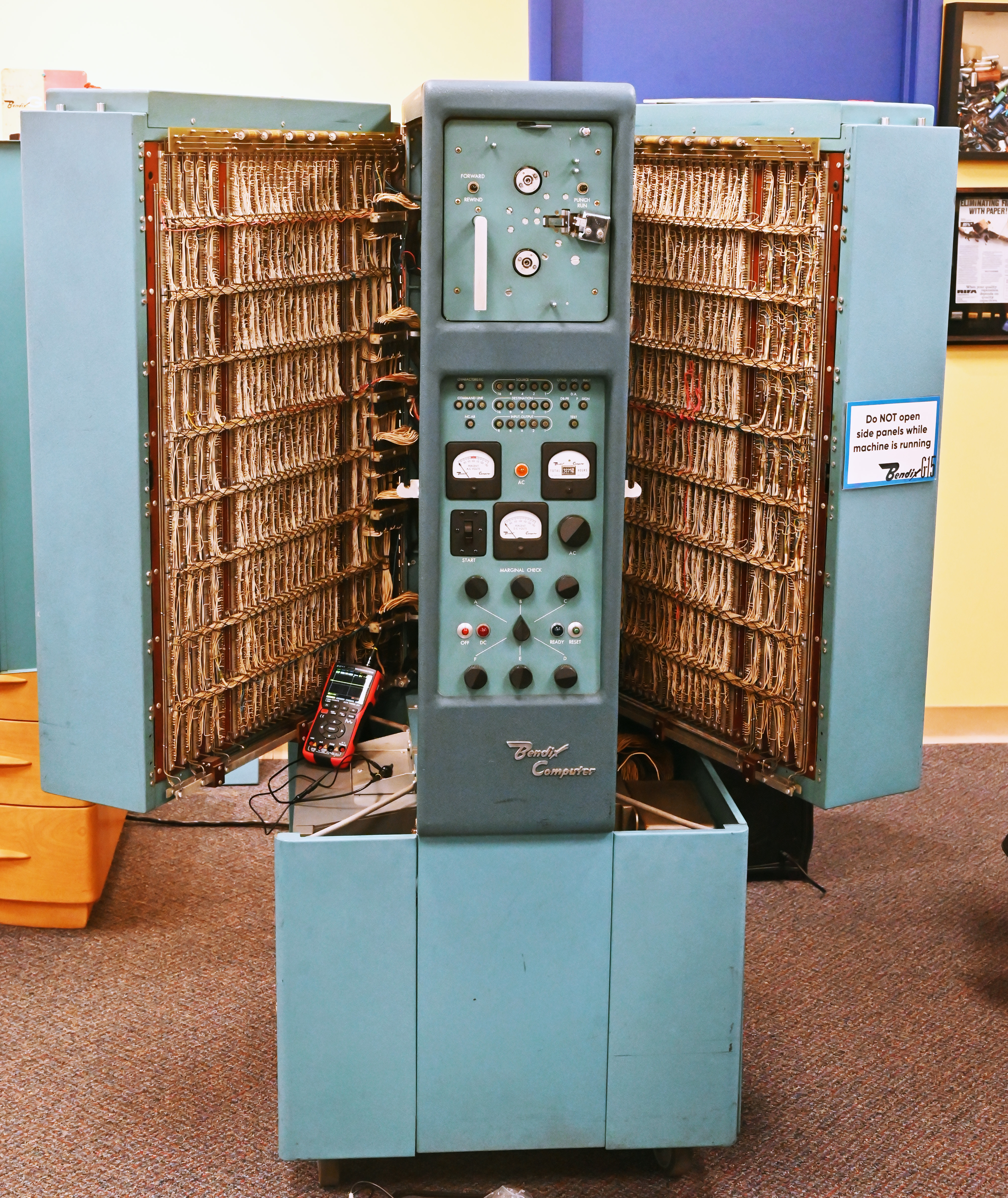
With side panels open

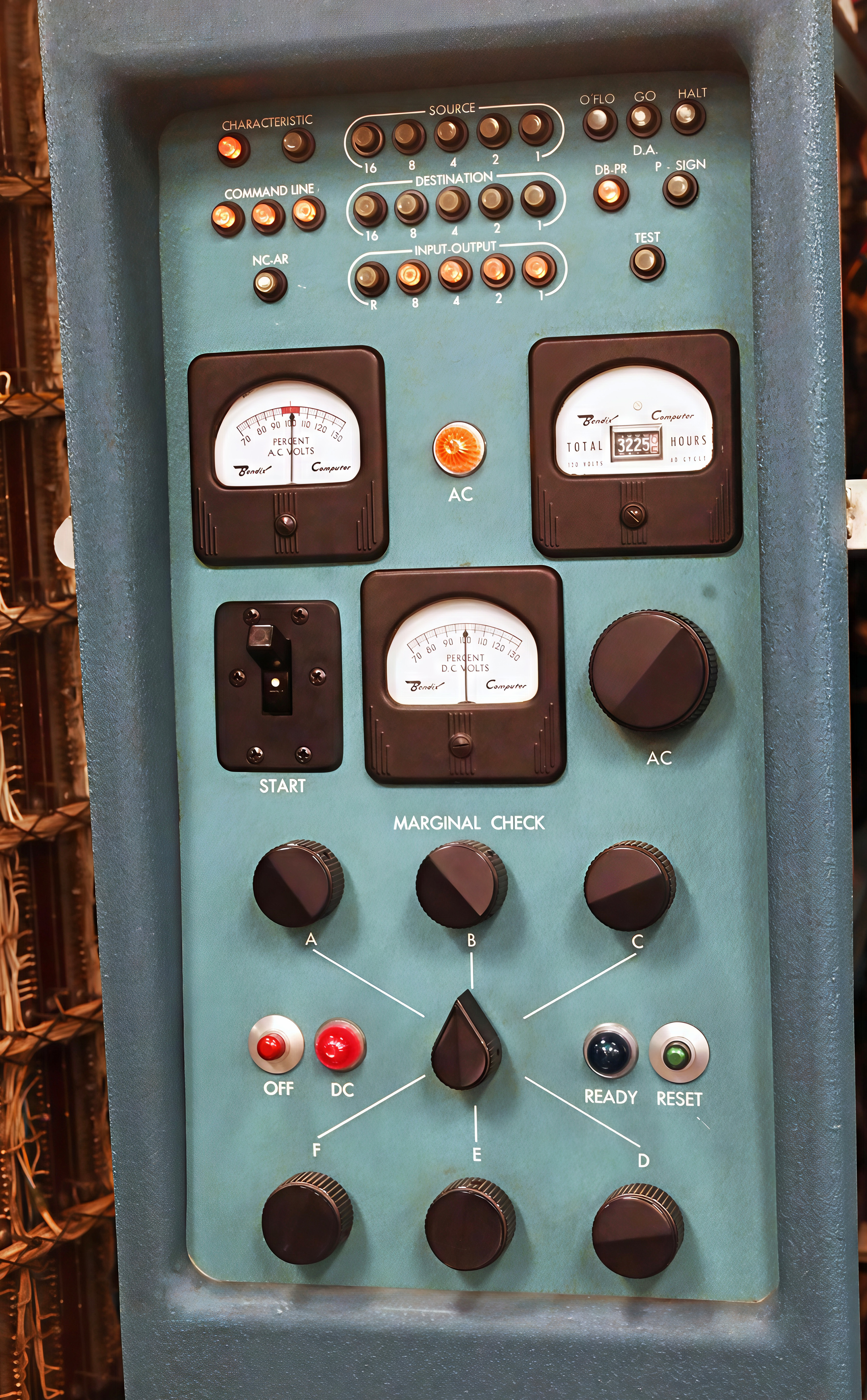
Front panel

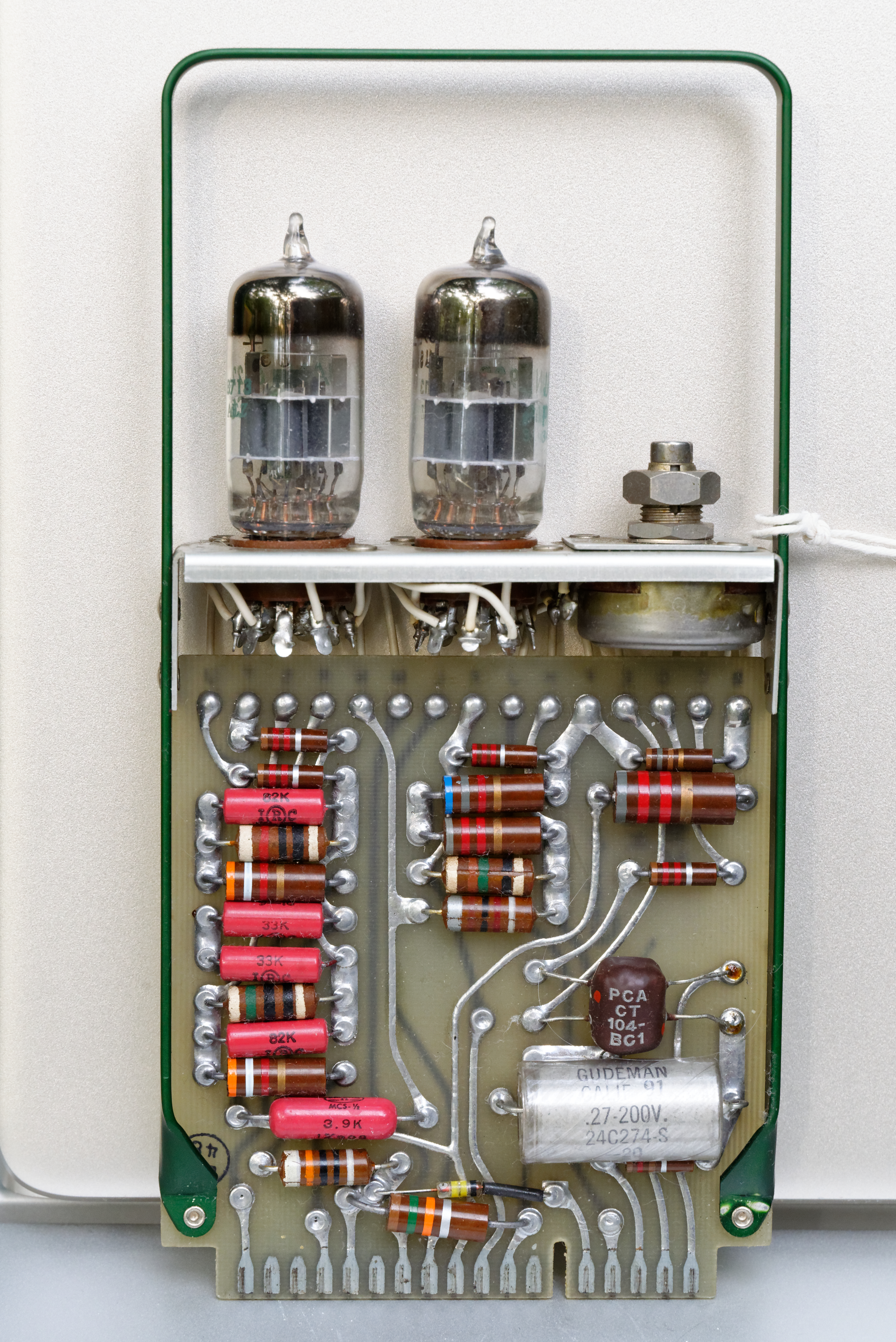
A read amplifier module from a G-15

The Bendix G-15 is a computer introduced in 1956 by the Bendix Corporation, Computer Division, Los Angeles, California. It is about 5 ft × 3 ft × 3 ft (1.52 m × 0.91 m × 0.91 m) and weighs about 966 lb (438 kg). The G-15 has a drum memory of 2,160 29-bit words, along with 20 words used for special purposes and rapid-access storage. The base system, without peripherals, cost $49,500. A working model cost around $60,000 (equivalent to $710,526 in 2025). It could also be rented for $1,485 per month. It was meant for scientific and industrial markets. The series was gradually discontinued when Control Data Corporation took over the Bendix computer division in 1963.

The chief designer of the G-15 was Harry Huskey, who had worked with Alan Turing on the Automatic Computing Engine (ACE) in the United Kingdom and on the Standards Western Automatic Computer (SWAC) in the 1950s. He made most of the design while working as a professor at University of California, Berkeley (where his graduate students included Niklaus Wirth), and other universities. David C. Evans was one of the Bendix engineers on the G-15 project. He would later become famous for his work in computer graphics and for starting up Evans & Sutherland with Ivan Sutherland.

== Architecture ==
The G-15 was inspired by the Automatic Computing Engine (ACE). It is a serial-architecture machine, in which the main memory is a magnetic drum. It uses the drum as a recirculating delay-line memory, in contrast to the analog delay line implementation in other serial designs. Each track has a set of read and write heads; as soon as a bit is read off a track, it is re-written on the same track a certain distance away. The length of delay, and thus the number of words on a track, is determined by the spacing of the read and write heads, the delay corresponding to the time required for a section of the drum to travel from the write head to the corresponding read head. Under normal operation, data are written back without change, but this data flow can be intercepted at any time, allowing the machine to update sections of a track as needed.

This arrangement allows the designers to create "delay lines" of any desired length. In addition to the twenty "long lines" of 108 words each, there are four more short lines of four words each. These short lines recycle at 27 times the rate of the long lines, allowing fast access to frequently needed data. Even the machine's accumulators are implemented as drum lines: three double-word lines are used for intermediate storage and double-precision addition, multiplication, and division in addition to a one single-word accumulator. This use of the drum rather than flip-flops for the registers helped to reduce vacuum tube count.

A consequence of this design is that, unlike other computers with magnetic drums, the G-15 does not retain its memory when it is shut off. The only permanent tracks are two timing tracks recorded on the drum at the factory. The second track is a backup, as the tracks are liable to erasure if one of their amplifier tubes were to short-circuit.

The serial nature of the G-15's memory was carried over into the design of its arithmetic and control circuits. The adders work on one binary digit at a time, and even the instruction word was designed to minimize the number of bits in an instruction that needed to be retained in flip-flops (to the extent of leveraging another one-word drum line used exclusively for generating address timing signals).

The G-15 has 180 vacuum tube packs and 3000 germanium diodes. It has a total of about 450 tubes, mostly dual triodes. Its magnetic drum memory holds 2,160 words of twenty-nine bits. Average memory access time is 14.5 milliseconds, but its instruction addressing architecture can reduce this dramatically for well-written programs. Its addition time is 270 microseconds, not counting memory access time. Single-precision multiplication takes 2,439 microseconds and double-precision multiplication takes 16,700 microseconds.

== Peripherals ==
One of the G-15's primary output devices is the typewriter with an output speed of about 10 characters per second for numbers (and lower-case hexadecimal characters u-z) and about three characters per second for alphabetic characters. The machine's limited storage precludes much output of anything but numbers; occasionally, paper forms with pre-printed fields or labels were inserted into the typewriter. A faster typewriter unit was also available.

The high-speed photoelectric paper tape reader (250 hexadecimal digits per second on five-channel paper tape for the PR-1; 400 characters from 5-8 channel tape for the PR-2) read programs from, and occasionally saved data to, tapes that were often mounted in cartridges for easy loading and unloading. Not unlike magnetic tape, the paper tape data are blocked into runs of 108 words, or less, since that is the maximum read size. A cartridge can contain many multiple blocks, up to 2500 words (~10 kilobytes).

While there is an optional high-speed paper tape punch (the PTP-1 at 60 digits per second) for output, the standard punch operates at 17 hex characters per second (510 bytes per minute).

Optionally, the AN-1 "Universal Code Accessory" included the "35-4" Friden Flexowriter and HSR-8 paper tape reader and HSP-8 paper tape punch. The mechanical reader and punch can process paper tapes up to eight channels wide at 110 characters per second.

The CA-1 "Punched Card Coupler" can connect one or two IBM 026 card punches (which were more often used as manual devices) to read cards at 17 columns per second (approximately 12 full cards per minute) or punch cards at 11 columns per second (approximately 8 full cards per minute). Partially full cards were processed more quickly with an 80-column-per-second skip speed). The more expensive CA-2 Punched Card Coupler reads and punches cards at a 100-card-per-minute rate.

The PA-3 pen plotter runs at 1 inch per second with 200 increments per inch on a paper roll 1 foot wide by 100 feet long. The optional retractable pen-holder eliminates "retrace lines".

The MTA-2 can interface up to four drives for half-inch Mylar magnetic tapes, which can store as many as 300,000 words (in blocks no longer than 108 words). The read/write rate is 430 hexadecimal digits per second; the bidirectional search speed is 2500 characters per second.

The DA-1 differential analyzer facilitates solution of differential equations. It contains 108 integrators and 108 constant multipliers, sporting 34 updates per second.

== Software ==
A problem peculiar to machines with serial memory is the latency of the storage medium: instructions and data are not always immediately available and, in the worst case, the machine must wait for the complete recirculation of a delay line to obtain data from a given memory address. The problem is addressed in the G-15 by what the Bendix literature calls "minimum-access coding". Each instruction carries with it the address of the next instruction to be executed, allowing the programmer to arrange instructions such that when one instruction completes, the next instruction is about to appear under the read head for its line. Data can be staggered in a similar manner. To aid this process, the coding sheets include a table containing numbers of all addresses; the programmer can cross off each address as it is used. Bendix has an operating system of the same name.

A symbolic assembler, similar to the IBM 650's Symbolic Optimal Assembly Program (SOAP), was introduced in the late 1950s and includes routines for minimum-access coding. Other programming aids include a supervisor program, a floating-point interpretive system named "Intercom", and ALGO, an algebraic language designed from the 1958 Preliminary Report of the ALGOL committee. Users also developed their own tools, and a variant of Intercom suited to the needs of civil engineers is said to have circulated.

Floating-point arithmetic is implemented in software. The "Intercom" series of languages provide an easier to program virtual machine that operates in floating point. Instructions to Intercom 500, 550, and 1000 are numerical, six or seven digits in length. Instructions are stored sequentially; the beauty is convenience, not speed. Intercom 1000 even has an optional double-precision version.

As mentioned above the machine uses hexadecimal numbers, but the user never has to deal with this in normal programming. The user programs use the decimal numbers while the OS resides in the higher addresses.

== Significance ==
The G-15 is sometimes described as the first personal computer, because it has the Intercom interpretive system. The title is disputed by other machines, such as the LGP-30 (shipped in late 1956), and the DEC LINC (March 1962) and PDP-8 (March 1965), while some maintain that only microcomputers, such as those which appeared in the 1970s, can be called personal computers. Nevertheless, the machine's low acquisition and operating costs, and the fact that it does not require a dedicated operator, meant that organizations could allow users complete access to the machine.

Over 400 G-15s were manufactured. About 300 G-15s were installed in the United States and a few were sold in other countries such as Australia and Canada. The machine found a niche in civil engineering, where it was used to solve cut and fill problems. Some have survived and have made their way to computer museums or science and technology museums around the world. Since early October 2025 System Source Computer Museum has a working numeric model G-15, with another potentially joining in before 2030.

Huskey received one of the last production G15s, fitted with a gold-plated front panel.

This was the first computer that Ken Thompson ever used.

A Bendix G-15 was used at Fremont High School (Oakland Unified School District) in the 1964-65 school year for the senior seminar math class. Students were taught the fundamentals of programming. One such exercise was the calculation of a square root using Newton's method. Another G-15 was placed at San Juan High School, near Sacramento, CA (San Juan Unified School District) in the 1964-65 school year. The curriculum included programming basics and exercises, as well as hands-on training. A Bendix G-15 was still in use for the UC Berkeley extension summer class in programming, at Oakland Technical High School, in 1970.

A Bendix G-15 was used at the Summer Science Program, at least in 1962 and 1963. One of the teaching assistants, a graduate student at University of California, Los Angeles, reported that one was used to check syntax of Fortran programs before they could be submitted to the IBM 7094. The son of the engineer who arranged the use of the computer was a student in 1963. The program began as a six-week residential science enrichment course for advanced rising high-school seniors, at The Thacher School in Ojai, California, as a collaboration between the headmaster, Stanford University, California Institute of Technology, and Harvey Mudd College, in response to Sputnik 1. The curriculum was focused on astronomy, with a laboratory project that consisted of photographing an asteroid three times and computing its orbit. It is now a nonprofit program wholly owned and operated by alumni, offering biochemistry, genomics, and synthetic chemistry, in addition to the original astronomy (now astrophysics) program.

In 2025, a Bendix G-15 was restored to working order for the System Source Computer Museum. It is reported to be the oldest working digital computer in North America.

== See also ==
- List of vacuum-tube computers
- Bendix G-20
