= Wirsing =

Wirsing is a German language nickname surname and may refer to:

- Anke Wirsing (born 1980), Canadian politician
- Eduard Wirsing (1931–2022), German mathematician
- Giselher Wirsing (1907–1975), German journalist
- Hans-Peter Wirsing (1938–2009), German painter
- Martin Wirsing (born 1948), German computer scientist
- Toni Wirsing (born 1990), German motorcycle racer
- Werner Wirsing (1919–2017), German architect

== See also ==
- Josef Wirsching (1903–1967), German cinematographer
