= ALGOL 60 =

Member of the ALGOL family of computer programming languages

- Paradigms: Procedural, imperative, structured
- Family: ALGOL
- Designed by: Backus, Bauer, Green, Katz, McCarthy, Naur, Perlis, Rutishauser, Samelson, van Wijngaarden, Vauquois, Wegstein, Woodger
- First appeared: 1960; 66 years ago
- Typing discipline: Static, strong
- Scope: Lexical

Influenced by
- ALGOL 58

Influenced
- Most subsequent imperative languages (so-called ALGOL-like languages), e.g., PL/I, Simula, CPL, Pascal, Ada, C

ALGOL 60 (short for Algorithmic Language 1960) is a member of the ALGOL family of computer programming languages. It followed on from ALGOL 58 which had introduced code blocks and the begin and end pairs for delimiting them, representing a key advance in the rise of structured programming. ALGOL 60 was one of the first languages implementing function definitions (that could be invoked recursively). ALGOL 60 function definitions could be nested within one another (a feature introduced by ALGOL 60) with lexical scope. It gave rise to many other languages, including CPL, PL/I, Simula, BCPL, B, Pascal, and C. Practically every computer of the era had a systems programming language based on ALGOL 60 concepts.

Niklaus Wirth based his own ALGOL W on ALGOL 60 before moving to develop Pascal. Algol-W was intended to be the next generation ALGOL but the ALGOL 68 committee decided on a design that was more complex and advanced rather than a cleaned simplified ALGOL 60. The official ALGOL versions are named after the year they were first published. ALGOL 68 is substantially different from ALGOL 60 and was criticised partially for being so, so that in general "ALGOL" refers to dialects of ALGOL 60.

== Standardization ==
ALGOL 60 – with COBOL – were the first languages to seek standardization.

- ISO 1538:1984 Programming languages – ALGOL 60 (stabilized)
- ISO/TR 1672:1977 Hardware representation of ALGOL basic symbols ... (now withdrawn)

== History ==
ALGOL 60 was used mostly by research computer scientists in the United States and in Europe. Its use in commercial applications was hindered by the absence of standard input/output facilities in its description and the lack of interest in the language by large computer vendors. ALGOL 60 did however become the standard for the publication of algorithms and had a profound effect on future language development.

John Backus developed the Backus normal form method of describing programming languages specifically for ALGOL 58. It was revised and expanded by Peter Naur for ALGOL 60, and at Donald Knuth's suggestion renamed Backus–Naur form.

Peter Naur: "As editor of the ALGOL Bulletin I was drawn into the international discussions of the language and was selected to be member of the European language design group in November 1959. In this capacity I was the editor of the ALGOL 60 report, produced as the result of the ALGOL 60 meeting in Paris in January 1960."

The following people attended the meeting in Paris (from January 11 to 16):

- Friedrich Ludwig Bauer, Peter Naur, Heinz Rutishauser, Klaus Samelson, Bernard Vauquois, Adriaan van Wijngaarden, and Michael Woodger (from Europe)
- John Warner Backus, Julien Green, Charles Katz, John McCarthy, Alan Jay Perlis, and Joseph Henry Wegstein (from the USA).

Alan Perlis gave a vivid description of the meeting: "The meetings were exhausting, interminable, and exhilarating. One became aggravated when one's good ideas were discarded along with the bad ones of others. Nevertheless, diligence persisted during the entire period. The chemistry of the 13 was excellent."

The language originally did not include recursion. It was inserted into the specification at the last minute, against the wishes of some of the committee.

Several authors of the original report met in April 1962 to resolve issues that had arisen. Their work resulted in the publication of the "Revised report on the algorithmic language ALGOL 60".

Further clarifications and the inclusion of I/O procedures were made by the Working Group 2.1 of IFIP Technical Committee 2. These efforts were published as the "Modified Report on the algorithmic language ALGOL 60" in 1975.

ALGOL 60 inspired many languages that followed it. Tony Hoare remarked: "Here is a language so far ahead of its time that it was not only an improvement on its predecessors but also on nearly all its successors."

=== ALGOL 60 implementations timeline ===
To date there have been at least 70 augmentations, extensions, derivations and sublanguages of ALGOL 60.

Name	Year	Author	State	Description	Target CPU
X1 ALGOL 60	August 1960	Edsger W. Dijkstra and Jaap A. Zonneveld	Netherlands	First implementation of ALGOL 60	Electrologica X1
Algol	1960	Edgar T. Irons	USA	ALGOL 60	CDC 1604
Burroughs Algol (Several variants)	1961	Burroughs Corporation (with participation by Hoare, Dijkstra, and others)	USA	Basis of the Burroughs (and now Unisys MCP based) computers	Burroughs Large Systems and midrange systems
Case ALGOL	1961		USA	Simula was originally contracted as a simulation extension of the Case ALGOL	UNIVAC 1107
GOGOL	1961	William M. McKeeman	USA	For ODIN time-sharing system	PDP-1
DASK ALGOL	1961	Peter Naur, Jørn Jensen	Denmark	ALGOL 60	DASK at Regnecentralen
SMIL ALGOL	1962	Torgil Ekman, Carl-Erik Fröberg	Sweden	ALGOL 60	SMIL at Lund University
GIER ALGOL	1962	Peter Naur, Jørn Jensen	Denmark	ALGOL 60	GIER at Regnecentralen
Dartmouth ALGOL 30	1962	Thomas Eugene Kurtz, Stephen J. Garland, Robert F. Hargraves, Anthony W. Knapp, Jorge LLacer	USA	ALGOL 60	LGP-30
Alcor Mainz 2002	1962	Ursula Hill-Samelson, Hans Langmaack	Germany		Siemens 2002
ALCOR-Illinois 7090	1962	Manfred Paul, Hans Rüdiger Wiehle, David Gries, and Rudolf Bayer	USA, West Germany	ALGOL 60; Implemented at Illinois and the TH München, 1962–1964	IBM 7090
USS 90 Algol	1962	L. Petrone	Italy		
Elliott ALGOL	1962	C. A. R. Hoare	UK	Discussed in his 1980 Turing Award lecture	Elliott 803 & the Elliott 503
ALGOL 60	1962	Roland Strobel	East Germany	Implemented by the Institute for Applied Mathematics, German Academy of Sciences at Berlin	Zeiss-Rechenautomat ZRA 1
ALGOL 60	1962	Bernard Vauquois, Louis Bolliet	France	Institut d'Informatique et Mathématiques Appliquées de Grenoble (IMAG) and Compagnie des Machines Bull	Bull Gamma 60
Algol Translator	1962	G. van der Mey and W.L. van der Poel	Netherlands	Staatsbedrijf der Posterijen, Telegrafie en Telefonie	ZEBRA
Kidsgrove Algol	1963	F. G. Duncan	UK		English Electric Company KDF9
SCALP	1963	Stephen J. Garland, Anthony W. Knapp, Thomas Eugene Kurtz	USA	Self-Contained ALgol Processor for a subset of ALGOL 60	LGP-30
VALGOL	1963	Val Schorre	USA	A test of the META II compiler compiler	
FP6000 Algol	1963	Roger Moore	Canada	written for Saskatchewan Power Corp	FP6000
Whetstone	1964	Brian Randell and Lawford John Russell	UK	Atomic Power Division of English Electric Company. Precursor to Ferranti Pegasus, National Physical Laboratories ACE and English Electric DEUCE implementations	English Electric Company KDF9
ALGOL 60	1964	Jean-Claude Boussard	France	Institut d'informatique et mathématiques appliquées de Grenoble	IBM 7090
ALGOL-GENIUS	1964	Börje Langefors	Sweden	Added COBOL-inspired data records and I/O	Datasaab D-21
ALGOL 60	1965	Claude Pair	France	Centre de calcul de la Faculté des Sciences de Nancy	IBM 1620
Dartmouth ALGOL	1965	Stephen J. Garland, Sarr Blumson, Ron Martin	USA	ALGOL 60	Dartmouth Time-Sharing System for the GE 235
NU ALGOL	1965		Norway		UNIVAC
ALGOL 60	1965	F.E.J. Kruseman Aretz	Netherlands	MC compiler for the EL-X8	Electrologica X8
ALGEK	1965		USSR	Minsk-22	АЛГЭК, based on ALGOL 60 and COBOL support, for economical tasks
MALGOL	1966	publ. A. Viil, M Kotli & M. Rakhendi,	Estonian SSR	Minsk-22	
ALGAMS	1967	GAMS group (ГАМС, группа автоматизации программирования для машин среднего класса), cooperation of Comecon Academies of Science	Comecon	Minsk-22, later ES EVM, BESM	
ALGOL/ZAM	1967		Poland		Polish ZAM computer
Chinese Algol	1972		China	Chinese characters, expressed via the Symbol system	
DG/L	1972		USA		DG Eclipse family of Computers
NASE	1990	Erik Schoenfelder	Germany	Interpreter	Linux and MS Windows
MARST	2000	Andrew Makhorin	Russia	ALGOL 60 to C translator	All CPUs supported by the GNU Compiler Collection; MARST is part of the GNU project

The Burroughs dialects included special system programming dialects such as ESPOL and NEWP.

== Properties ==
ALGOL 60 as officially defined had no I/O facilities; implementations defined their own in ways that were rarely compatible with each other. In contrast, ALGOL 68 offered an extensive library of transput (ALGOL 68 parlance for input/output) facilities.

ALGOL 60 provided two evaluation strategies for parameter passing: the common call-by-value, and call-by-name. The procedure declaration specified, for each formal parameter, which was to be used: value specified for call-by-value, and omitted for call-by-name. Call-by-name recomputes every parameter when it is used in an expression, so has certain effects in contrast to call-by-reference. For example, without specifying the parameters as value or reference, it is impossible to develop a procedure that will swap the values of two parameters if the actual parameters that are passed in are an integer variable and an array that is indexed by that same integer variable. Think of passing a pointer to swap(i, A[i]) in to a function. Now that every time swap is referenced, it's reevaluated. Say i := 1 and A[i] := 2, so every time swap is referenced it'll return the other combination of the values ([1,2], [2,1], [1,2] and so on). A similar situation occurs with a random function passed as actual argument.

Call-by-name is known by many compiler designers for the interesting "thunks" that are used to implement it. Donald Knuth devised the "man or boy test" to separate compilers that correctly implemented "recursion and non-local references." This test contains an example of call-by-name.

=== Language levels ===
The ALGOL 60 reports recognize three different levels of language, i.e., a Reference Language, a Publication Language, and several Hardware Representations. The Reference and Publication languages have no reserved words, however the reports do recommend reserving some identifiers for standard functions. The Reference Language has lower case letters and other characters not available in the 6-bit character sets typical of ALGOL 60's era. (Note: Unicode, which came decades later, supports all of: U+003A : COLON; U+003B ; SEMICOLON; U+005B [ LEFT SQUARE BRACKET; U+005D ] RIGHT SQUARE BRACKET; U+00AC ¬ NOT SIGN; U+00D7 × MULTIPLICATION SIGN; U+00F7 ÷ DIVISION SIGN; U+2191 ↑ UPWARDS ARROW; U+2227 ∧ LOGICAL AND; U+2228 ∨ LOGICAL OR; U+2260 ≠ NOT EQUAL TO; U+2261 ≡ IDENTICAL TO; U+2264 ≤ LESS-THAN OR EQUAL TO; U+2265 ≥ GREATER-THAN OR EQUAL TO; U+2283 ⊃ SUPERSET OF; in addition to lower case letters.)

The reports briefly describe hardware representations. Implementations differ in their hardware representations of underlined independent basic symbols.

1. Reserved words
2. Stropping

They also differ in their hardware representation of delimiters.

=== ALGOL 60 Reserved words and restricted identifiers ===
There are 24 basic symbols in the Modified Report that are words in boldface. Although those words are not reserved in the reference and publication languages, some hardware implementations may reserve them. There are 24 such words in the Modified Report:

- ARRAY
- BEGIN
- BOOLEAN
- COMMENT
- DO
- ELSE
- END
- FALSE
- FOR
- GOTO
- IF
- INTEGER
- LABEL
- OWN
- PROCEDURE
- REAL
- STEP
- STRING
- SWITCH
- THEN
- TRUE
- UNTIL
- VALUE
- WHILE

There are 35 such reserved words in the standard Burroughs Large Systems sub-language:

- ALPHA
- ARRAY
- BEGIN
- BOOLEAN
- COMMENT
- CONTINUE
- DIRECT
- DO
- DOUBLE
- ELSE
- END
- EVENT
- FALSE
- FILE
- FOR
- FORMAT
- GO
- IF
- INTEGER
- LABEL
- LIST
- LONG
- OWN
- POINTER
- PROCEDURE
- REAL
- STEP
- SWITCH
- TASK
- THEN
- TRUE
- UNTIL
- VALUE
- WHILE
- ZIP

There are 71 such restricted identifiers in the standard Burroughs Large Systems sub-language:

- ACCEPT
- AND
- ATTACH
- BY
- CALL
- CASE
- CAUSE
- CLOSE
- DEALLOCATE
- DEFINE
- DETACH
- DISABLE
- DISPLAY
- DIV
- DUMP
- ENABLE
- EQL
- EQV
- EXCHANGE
- EXTERNAL
- FILL
- FORWARD
- GEQ
- GTR
- IMP
- IN
- INTERRUPT
- IS
- LB
- LEQ
- LIBERATE
- LINE
- LOCK
- LSS
- MERGE
- MOD
- MONITOR
- MUX
- NEQ
- NO
- NOT
- ON
- OPEN
- OR
- OUT
- PICTURE
- PROCESS
- PROCURE
- PROGRAMDUMP
- RB
- READ
- RELEASE
- REPLACE
- RESET
- RESIZE
- REWIND
- RUN
- SCAN
- SEEK
- SET
- SKIP
- SORT
- SPACE
- SWAP
- THRU
- TIMES
- TO
- WAIT
- WHEN
- WITH
- WRITE

and also the names of all the intrinsic functions.

==== Standard operators ====
Priority		Operator
first arithmetic	first	↑ (power)
first arithmetic	second	×, / (real), ÷ (integer)
first arithmetic	third	+, -
second		<, ≤, =, ≥, >, ≠
third		¬ (not)
fourth		∧ (and)
fifth		∨ (or)
sixth		⊃ (implication)
seventh		≡ (equivalence)

== Examples and portability issues ==
=== Code sample comparisons ===
==== ALGOL 60 ====
procedure Absmax(a) Size:(n, m) Result:(y) Subscripts:(i, k);
    value n, m; array a; integer n, m, i, k; real y;
comment The absolute greatest element of the matrix a, of size n by m,
    is copied to y, and the subscripts of this element to i and k;
begin
    integer p, q;
    y := 0; i := k := 1;
    for p := 1 step 1 until n do
        for q := 1 step 1 until m do
            if abs(a[p, q]) > y then
                begin y := abs(a[p, q]);
                    i := p; k := q
                end
end Absmax;

Implementations differ in how the text in bold must be written. For example, the word 'INTEGER', including the quotation marks, must be used in some implementations in place of integer, above, thereby designating it as a special ALGOL symbol.

The following version uses the hardware representation supported by the ALCOR compiler for the IBM 7090. The ALGOL symbols are stropped. Additionally, it uses .. to represent the colon character, .= for assignment, (/ and )/ instead of brackets, and ., for semicolon. Lower case characters were not supported, so upper case is used:

'PROCEDURE' ABSMAX(A) SIZE..(N, M) RESULT..(Y) SUBSCRIPTS..(I, K).,
    'VALUE' N, M., 'ARRAY' A., 'INTEGER' N, M, I, K., 'REAL' Y.,
'COMMENT' THE ABSOLUTE GREATEST ELEMENT OF THE MATRIX A, OF SIZE N BY M,
    IS COPIED TO Y, AND THE SUBSCRIPTS OF THIS ELEMENT TO I AND K.,
'BEGIN'
    'INTEGER' P, Q.,
    Y .= 0; I .= K .= 1.,
    'FOR' P .= 1 'STEP' 1 'UNTIL' N 'DO'
        'FOR' Q .= 1 'STEP' 1 'UNTIL' M 'DO'
            'IF' ABS(A(/P, Q/)) 'GREATER' Y 'THEN'
                'BEGIN' Y .= ABS(A(/P, Q/)).,
                    I .= P; K .= Q
                'END'
'END' ABSMAX.,

Following is an example of how to produce a table using Elliott 803 ALGOL:

 FLOATING POINT ALGOL TEST'
 BEGIN REAL A,B,C,D'

 READ D'

 FOR A:= 0.0 STEP D UNTIL 6.3 DO
 BEGIN
   PRINT PUNCH(3),££L??'
   B := SIN(A)'
   C := COS(A)'
   PRINT PUNCH(3),SAMELINE,ALIGNED(1,6),A,B,C'
 END'
 END'

==== ALGOL 60 family ====
Since ALGOL 60 had no I/O facilities, there is no portable hello world program in ALGOL. The following program could (and still will) compile and run on an ALGOL implementation for a Unisys A-Series mainframe, and is a straightforward simplification of code taken from The Language Guide at the University of Michigan-Dearborn Computer and Information Science Department Hello world! ALGOL Example Program page.

BEGIN
  FILE F(KIND=REMOTE);
  EBCDIC ARRAY E[0:11];
  REPLACE E BY "HELLO WORLD!";
  WRITE(F, *, E);
END.

Where * etc. represented a format specification as used in FORTRAN, e.g.

A simpler program using an inline format:

 BEGIN
   FILE F(KIND=REMOTE);
   WRITE(F, <"HELLO WORLD!">);
 END.

An even simpler program using the Display statement:

BEGIN DISPLAY("HELLO WORLD!") END.

An alternative example, using Elliott Algol I/O is as follows. Elliott Algol used different characters for "open-string-quote" and "close-string-quote", represented here by ‘ and ’ .

 program HiFolks;
 begin
    print ‘Hello world’
 end;

Here's a version for the Elliott 803 Algol (A104) The standard Elliott 803 used 5-hole paper tape and thus only had upper case. The code lacked any quote characters so £ (pound sign) was used for open quote and ? (question mark) for close quote. Special sequences were placed in double quotes (e.g£., L?? produced a new line on the teleprinter).

  HIFOLKS'
  BEGIN
     PRINT £HELLO WORLD£L??'
  END'

The ICT 1900 series Algol I/O version allowed input from paper tape or punched card. Paper tape 'full' mode allowed lower case. Output was to a line printer. Note use of '(', ')', and %.

  'PROGRAM' (HELLO)
  'BEGIN'
     'COMMENT' OPEN QUOTE IS '(', CLOSE IS ')', PRINTABLE SPACE HAS TO
               BE WRITTEN AS % BECAUSE SPACES ARE IGNORED;
     WRITE TEXT('('HELLO%WORLD')');
  'END'
  'FINISH'

This example uses the outstring procedure as defined in the Modified Report:

 begin
   comment Uses I/O from the Modified Report.  It compiles and runs with the gnu marst compiler;
   outstring (1, "hello world!\n")
 end

== LEAP ==
LEAP is an extension to the ALGOL 60 programming language which provides an associative memory of triples. The three items in a triple denote the association that an Attribute of an Object has a specific Value. LEAP was created by Jerome Feldman (University of California Berkeley) and Paul Rovner (MIT Lincoln Lab) in 1967. LEAP was also implemented in SAIL.

== See also ==
- ABC ALGOL
- ALGOL
- ALGOL 58
- ALGOL N
- ALGOL 68
- ALGOL W
- ALGOL X
- Atlas Autocode
- Coral 66
- Edinburgh IMP
- Jensen's Device
- ISWIM
- JOVIAL
- NELIAC
- Simula
- S-algol
- Scheme (programming language)
