= Joseph Henry Woodger =

British philosopher of biology (1894–1981)

Woodger (top, centre) at the first Symposium for Growth and Development, North Truro, Massachusetts, 7–11 August 1939

Joseph Henry Woodger (2 May 1894 – 8 March 1981) was a British theoretical biologist and philosopher of biology whose attempts to make biological sciences more rigorous and empirical was significantly influential to the philosophy of biology in the twentieth century. Karl Popper, the prominent philosopher of science, claimed "Woodger... influenced and stimulated the evolution of the philosophy of science in Britain and in the United States as hardly anybody else".

== Life and work ==
Joseph Woodger was born at Great Yarmouth in Norfolk, and studied at University College London from 1911 until 1922, except for a period serving in the First World War. He then became a reader at the University of London Middlesex Hospital Medical School. He became a professor there in 1947, and eventually retired in 1959 as emeritus professor of biology. He was a member of the Theoretical Biology Club along with Joseph Needham, Conrad Hal Waddington, John Desmond Bernal, and Dorothy Wrinch. Karl Popper described the club as "one of the most interesting study circles in the field of the philosophy of science".

== Family ==
Woodger was known to friends and family as "Socrates", and with his wife Eden (born Buckle) he lived at Epsom in Surrey, where they had four children. His eldest child was Mike Woodger (born 1923), a computer pioneer who worked with Alan Turing at the National Physical Laboratory, leading to the early Pilot ACE computer. He died in 1981.

== On scientific method ==
Woodger led the introduction of positivist philosophy of science into biology with his 1929 book Biological Principles, for which he has been roundly if unfairly criticised. He saw a mature science as being characterised by a framework of hypotheses which could be verified by facts established by experiments. He criticised the traditional natural history style of biology, including the study of evolution, as immature science, since it relied on narrative.

For example, he wrote "Admittedly, some hypotheses have become so well established that no one doubts them. But this does not mean that they are known to be true. We cannot determine the truth of a hypothesis by counting the number of people who believe it, and a hypothesis does not cease to be a hypothesis when a lot of people believe it."

Woodger set out to play for biology the role of Robert Boyle's Sceptical Chymist, intending to convert the subject into a formal, unified science, and ultimately, following the Vienna Circle of logical positivists like Otto Neurath and Rudolf Carnap, to reduce biology to physics and chemistry. His efforts stimulated the biologist J. B. S. Haldane to push for the axiomatisation of biology, and helped to bring about the modern synthesis of evolutionary biology, combining genetics, evolution, ecology and other disciplines.

== Bibliography ==
- Elementary Morphology and Physiology for Medical Students: A Guide for the First Year and A Stepping Stone to the Second (1924). London: Humphrey-Milford.
- Biological Principles (1929). London: K. Paul, Trench, Trubner.
- The Axiomatic Method in Biology (1937). Cambridge, UK: Cambridge University Press.
- The Technique of Theory Construction (1939), Chicago.
- Biology and Language (1952). Cambridge, UK: Cambridge University Press.
