= Elliott ALGOL =

- Paradigms: Multi-paradigm: procedural, imperative, structured
- Family: ALGOL
- Designed by: Tony Hoare, Jill Hoare and others
- Developer: Elliott Brothers
- First appeared: February 1962; 63 years ago
- Typing discipline: Static, strong
- Scope: Lexical (static)
- Implementation language: Assembly
- Platform: Elliott 803

Influenced by
- ALGOL 60

Elliott ALGOL is a compiler for the programming language ALGOL 60, for the Elliott 803 computer made by Elliott Brothers in the United Kingdom. It was implemented by Tony Hoare and others. It differed slightly from the reference version of ALGOL, particularly in the supported character set. First released in February 1962, it is believed to be the first implementation of an ALGOL 60 compiler in a commercial context and was an unexpectedly popular product for the company.
