= ALCOR =

ALCOR (ALGOL Converter, acronym) is an early computer language definition created by the ALCOR Group, a consortium of universities, research institutions and manufacturers in Europe and the United States which was founded in 1959 and which had 60 members in 1966. The group had the aim of a common compiler specification for a subset of ALGOL 60 after the ALGOL meeting in Copenhagen in 1958.

In addition to its programming application, as the name Algol is also an astronomical reference, to the star Algol, so too, Alcor is a reference to the star Alcor. This star is the fainter companion of the 2nd magnitude star Zeta Ursae Majoris. This was sometimes ironized as being a bad omen for the future of the language.

In Europe, a high level machine architecture for ALGOL 60 was devised which was emulated on various real computers, among them the Siemens 2002 and the IBM 7090. An ALGOL manual was published which provided a detailed introduction of all features of the language with many program snippets, and four appendixes:

1. Revised Report on the Algorithmic Language ALGOL 60
2. Report on Subset ALGOL 60 (IFIP)
3. Report on Input-Output Procedures for ALGOL 60
4. An early "standard" character set for representing ALGOL 60 code on paper and paper tape. This character set introduced the characters "×", ";", "[", "]", and "⏨" into the CCITT-2 code, the first two replacing "?" and the BEL control character, the others taking unused code points.
