= Friedrich L. Bauer =

German computer scientist

Friedrich Ludwig Bauer
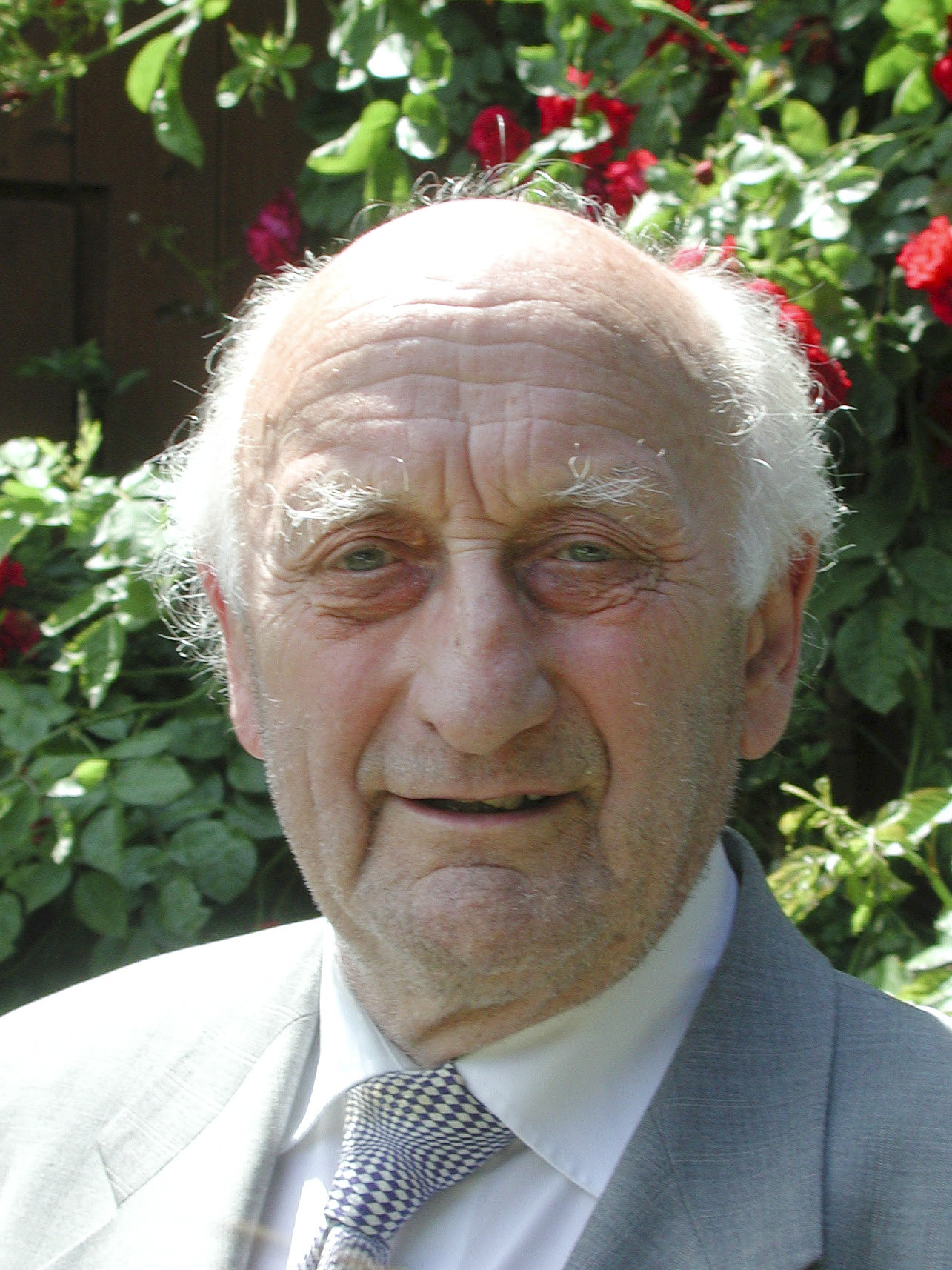
- Born: Friedrich Ludwig Bauer; 10 June 1924; Regensburg, Germany
- Died: 26 March 2015 (aged 90)
- Education: Ludwig-Maximilians-Universität München
- Known for: Stack (data structure); Sequential Formula Translation; ALGOL; Software engineering Bauer–Fike theorem
- Children: 5
- Awards: Iron Cross 2nd Class, Bundesverdienstkreuz 1st Class, IEEE Computer Pioneer Award (1988)
- Scientific career
- Fields: Computer science Applied mathematics
- Institutions: University of Mainz; Technical University of Munich
- Theses: Group-theoretic investigations of the theory of spin wave equations (1952); On quadratically convergent iteration methods for solving algebraic equations and eigenvalue problems (1954)
- Doctoral advisors: Fritz Bopp, Georg Aumann
- Doctoral students: Manfred Broy, David Gries, Josef Stoer, Peter Wynn, Christoph Zenger

Friedrich Ludwig "Fritz" Bauer (10 June 1924 – 26 March 2015) was a German pioneer of computer science and professor at the Technical University of Munich.

== Life ==
Bauer earned his Abitur in 1942 and served in the Wehrmacht during World War II, from 1943 to 1945. From 1946 to 1950, he studied mathematics and theoretical physics at the Ludwig-Maximilians-Universität München. Bauer received his Doctor of Philosophy (Ph.D.) under the supervision of Fritz Bopp for his thesis Gruppentheoretische Untersuchungen zur Theorie der Spinwellengleichungen ("Group-theoretic investigations of the theory of spin wave equations") in 1952. He completed his habilitation thesis Über quadratisch konvergente Iterationsverfahren zur Lösung von algebraischen Gleichungen und Eigenwertproblemen ("On quadratically convergent iteration methods for solving algebraic equations and eigenvalue problems") in 1954 at the Technical University of Munich. After teaching as a privatdozent at the Ludwig-Maximilians-Universität München from 1954 to 1958, he became extraordinary professor for applied mathematics at the University of Mainz. Since 1963, he worked as a professor of mathematics and (since 1972) computer science at the Technical University of Munich. He retired in 1989.

== Work ==
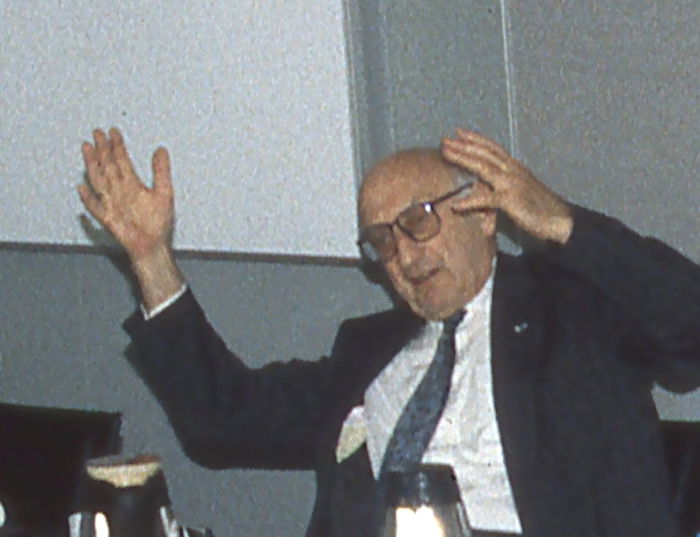
Friedrich L. Bauer at the editors' meeting of Informatik Spektrum on 29 May 1995.

Bauer's early work involved constructing computing machinery (e.g. the logical relay computer STANISLAUS from 1951 to 1955). In this context, he was the first to propose the widely used stack method of expression evaluation.

Bauer was a member of the committees that developed the imperative computer programming languages ALGOL 58, and its successor ALGOL 60, important predecessors to all modern imperative programming languages. For ALGOL 58, Bauer was with the German Gesellschaft für Angewandte Mathematik und Mechanik (GAMM, Society of Applied Mathematics and Mechanics) which worked with the American Association for Computing Machinery (ACM). For ALGOL 60, Bauer was with the International Federation for Information Processing (IFIP) IFIP Working Group 2.1 on Algorithmic Languages and Calculi, which specified, maintains, and supports the languages ALGOL 60 and ALGOL 68.

Bauer was an influential figure in establishing computer science as an independent subject in German universities, which until then was usually considered part of mathematics. In 1967, he held the first lecture in computer science at a German university at the Technical University of Munich, titled Information Processing. By 1972, computer science had become an independent academic discipline at the TUM. In 1992, it was separated from the Department of Mathematics to form an independent Department of Informatics, though Bauer had retired from his chair in 1989.

In October 11, 1968, he coined the term software engineering in a lecture of that title given at the NATO Science Committee meeting in Garmisch, Germany, which has been in widespread use since, and has become a discipline in computer science.

His scientific contributions spread from numerical analysis (Bauer–Fike theorem) and fundamentals of interpretation and translation of programming languages, to his later works on systematics of program development, especially program transformation methods and systems (CIP-S) and the associated wide-spectrum language system CIP-L. He also wrote a well-respected book on cryptology, Decrypted secrets, now in its fourth edition.

He was the doctoral advisor of 39 students, including Rudolf Berghammer, Manfred Broy, David Gries, Manfred Paul, Gerhard Seegmüller, Josef Stoer, Peter Wynn, and Christoph Zenger.

Friedrich Bauer was one of the 19 founding members of the German Informatics Society. He was editor of the Informatik Spektrum from its founding in 1978, and held that position until his death.

Friedrich Bauer was married to Hildegard Bauer-Vogg. He was the father of three sons and two daughters.

== Definition of software engineering ==
Bauer was a colleague of the German Representative the NATO Science Committee. In 1967, NATO had been discussing 'The Software Crisis' and Bauer had suggested the term 'Software Engineering' as a way to conceive of both the problem and the solution.

In 1972, Bauer published the following definition of software engineering:

"Establishment and use of sound engineering principles to economically obtain software that is reliable and works on real machines efficiently."

== Legacy ==
Since 1992, the Technical University of Munich has awarded the Friedrich L. Bauer Prize in computer science.

In 2014, the Technical University of Munich renamed their largest lecture hall in the Department of Informatics building after him.

== Awards ==
- 1944: Iron Cross 2nd Class
- 1968: Member of the Bavarian Academy of Sciences in mathematics and science class
- 1971: Bavarian Order of Merit
- 1978: Wilhelm Exner Medal (Austria).
- 1982: Federal Merit Cross 1st Class
- 1984: Member of the German Academy of Sciences Leopoldina
- 1986: Bavarian Maximilian Order for Science and Art
- 1987: Honorary Member of the Society for computer science
- 1988: Golden Ring of Honour of the German Museum
- 1988: IEEE Computer Pioneer Award
- 1997: Heinz-Maier-Leibnitz Medal from the Technical University of Munich
- 1998: corresponding member of the Austrian Academy of Sciences
- 2002: Honorary Member of the Deutsches Museum
- 2004: Silver Medal of Merit of the Bavarian Academy of Sciences

=== Honorary doctorates ===
- 1974: Honorary Doctor of the University of Grenoble
- 1989: Honorary Doctor of the University of Passau
- 1998: Honorary doctorate from the University of the Bundeswehr Munich (Neubiberg)

== See also ==
- List of pioneers in computer science

== Publications ==
- Samelson, Klaus; Bauer, Friedrich Ludwig (February 1960). "Sequential Formula Translation". Communications of the ACM. 3 (2): 76–83. doi:10.1145/366959.366968. S2CID 16646147., a very influential paper on compilers
- Baumann, Richard [in German]; Feliciano, Manuel; Bauer, Friedrich Ludwig; Samelson, Klaus (1964). Introduction to ALGOL – A primer for the non-specialist, emphasizing the practical uses of the algorithmic language. Series in Automatic Computation. Englewood Cliffs, New Jersey, USA: Prentice-Hall, Inc. LCCN 64-10740. ark:/13960/t6qz35p37. ISBN 0-13-477828-6.
- Bauer, Friedrich Ludwig (1987). The Munich Project CIP: Volume II: The Programme Transformation System CIP-S (Lecture Notes in Computer Science). Springer. ISBN 978-3-5401-8779-0.
- Bauer, Friedrich Ludwig; Wirsing, Martin (March 1991). Elementare Aussagenlogik (in German). Berlin – Heidelberg, Germany: Springer-Verlag. ISBN 3-540-52974-8.
- Bauer, Friedrich Ludwig (2006). Decrypted Secrets: Methods and Maxims of Cryptology, 4th edition. New York, USA: Springer. ISBN 978-3-5402-4502-5.
