= Jørn Jensen =

Danish computer programmer

- Born: 1925; Denmark
- Died: 2007 (aged 81–82)
- Occupation: Computer programmer
- Years active: 1956–2005
- Known for: Much pioneering computer programming in Denmark
- Notable work: DASK programs ALGOL 60 compilers

Jørn Jensen (1925 – 2007) was one of the earliest Danish computer programmers. Examined as a mechanical engineer, he had worked with electromechanical construction. In 1958, he was employed at the Danish Regnecentralen (RC), and very soon exhibited an extraordinary programming skill. He developed the main parts of the base programs to the Dansk Aritmetisk Sekvens Kalkulator (DASK, Danish Arithmetic Sequence Calculator), the first Danish computer. Among other programs, he designed a set of monitor programs to supervise the program running schedule on DASK. In tight collaboration with Peter Naur and others, he developed reliable, well documented compilers for the ALGOL 60 programming language. In this context, he invented Jensen's Device, an ingenious exploitation of the name parameters to compute numerical series without using procedure parameters, as is needed in all programming languages, except ALGOL 60 and Simula 67.

After some 20 years at Regnecentralen, he continued his career in systems programming, and other types, at the Brown, Boveri & Cie electrical engineering company.
