= Minsk family of computers =

Mainframe computers manufactured from 1959 to 1975

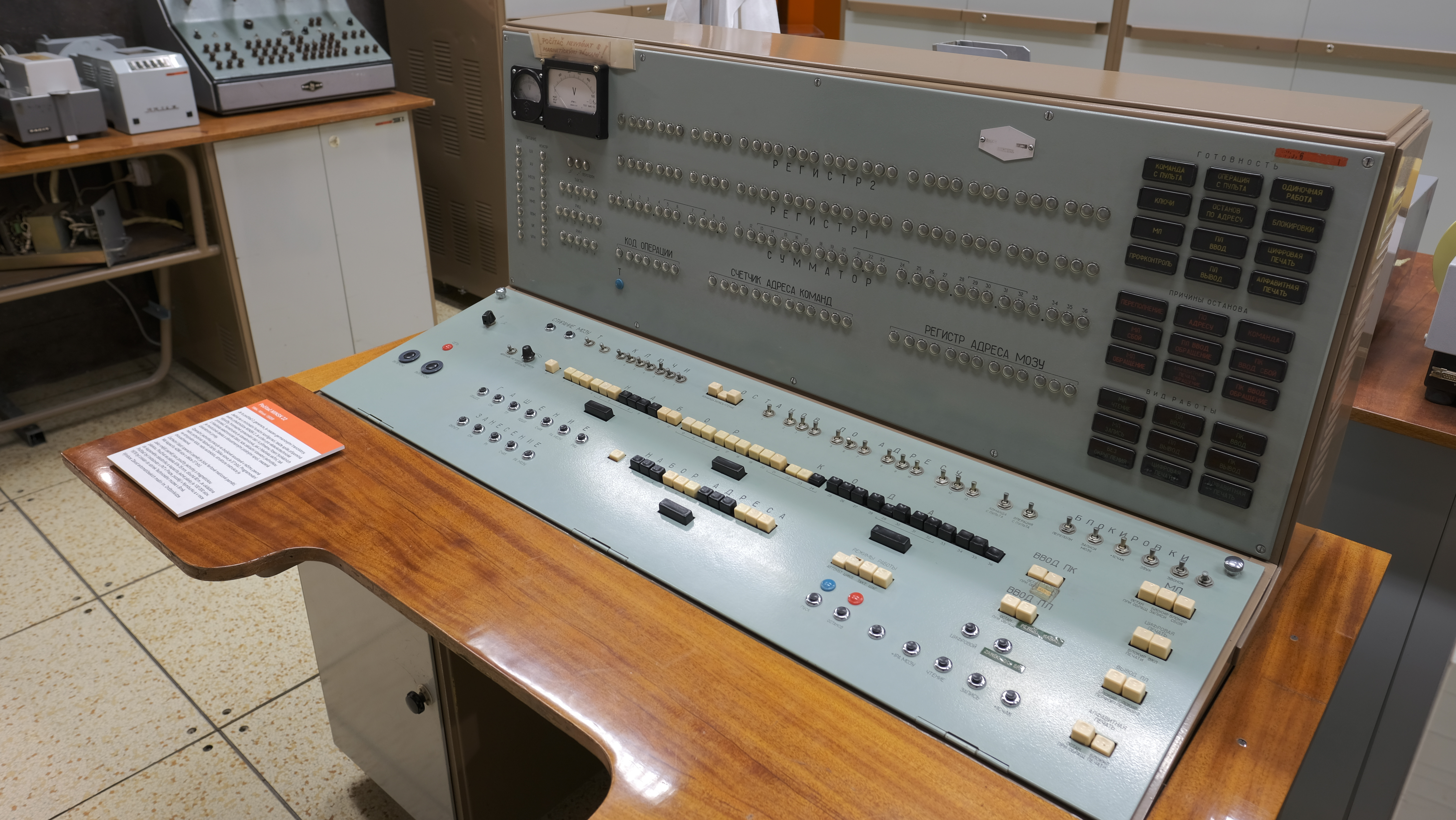
Control panel of Minsk 22 computer in the Technical Museum of Brno

Minsk was a family of mainframe computers that were developed in the Byelorussian SSR and manufactured at the Ordzhonikidze Computer Plant (Минский завод ЭВМ имени Г. К. Орджоникидзе) in Minsk from 1959 to 1975.

== Models ==
The MINSK-1 was a vacuum-tube digital computer that went into production in 1960.

The MINSK-2 was a solid-state digital computer that went into production in 1962.

The MINSK-22 was a modified version of Minsk-2 that went into production in 1965.

The MINSK-23 went into production in 1966.

The most advanced model was Minsk-32, developed in 1968. It supported COBOL, FORTRAN and ALGAMS (a version of ALGOL). This and earlier versions also used machine-oriented languages (autocodes). AKI (AvtoKod "Inzhener", i.e., "Engineer autocode"). It stood somewhere between the native assembly language SSK (Sistema Simvolicheskogo Kodirovaniya, or "System of symbolic coding") and higher-level languages, like FORTRAN. Another autocode was avtokod "Ekonomist" (автокод ЭКОНОМИСТ).

The word size was 31 bits for Minsk-1 and 37 bits for the other models.

At one point the Minsk-222 (an upgraded prototype based on the most popular model, Minsk-22) and Minsk-32 were considered as a potential base for a future unified line of mutually compatible mainframes — that would later become the ES EVM line, but despite being popular among users, good match between their tech and Soviet tech base and familiarity to both programmers and technicians lost to the proposal to copy the IBM/360 line of mainframes — the possibility to just copy all the software existing for it was deemed more important.

== See also ==
- Mark Nemenman
