= Martin Wirsing =

German computer scientist (born 1948)

Martin Hermann Friedrich Wirsing
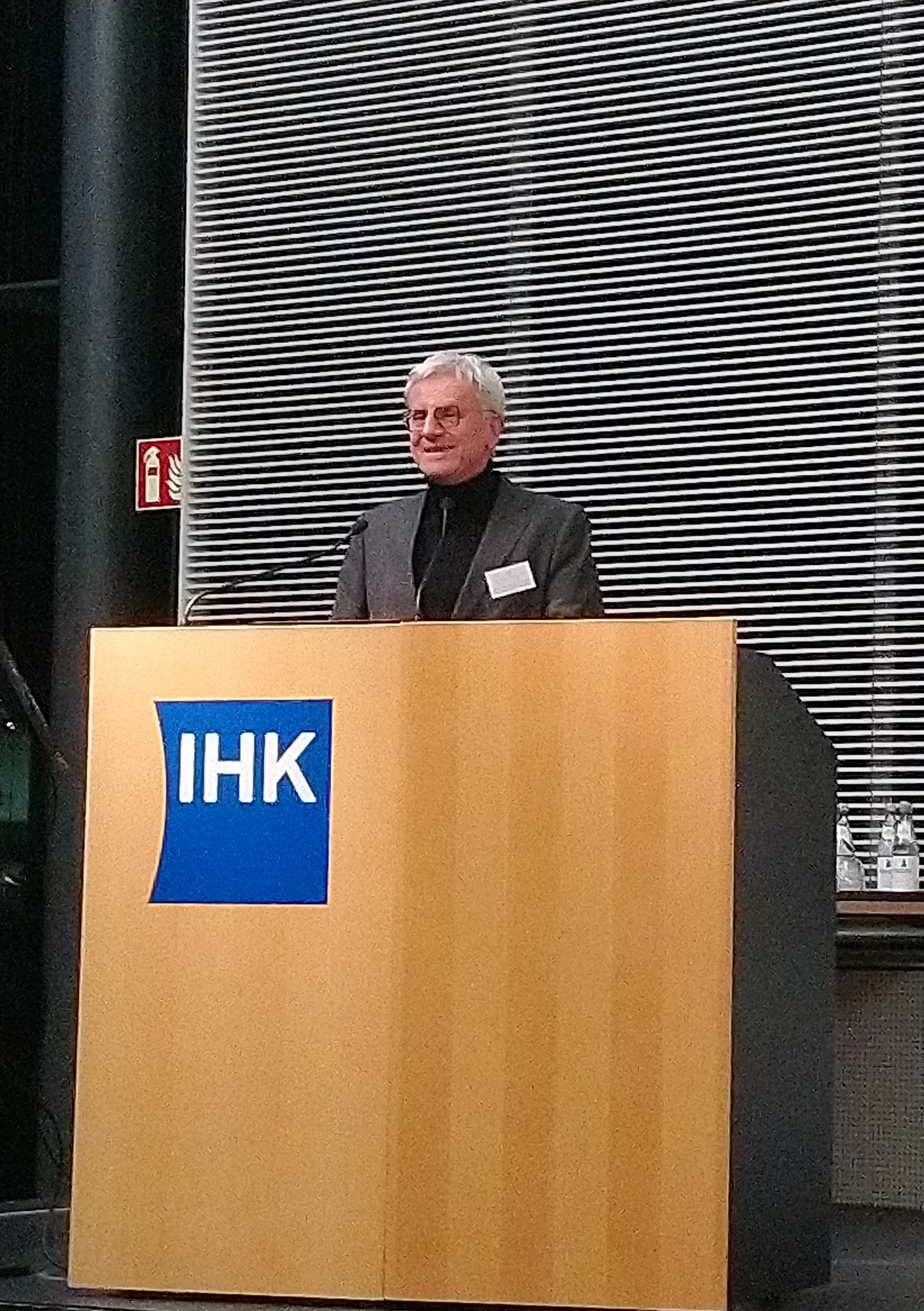
- Wirsing (2025)
- Born: December 24, 1948 (age 77)
- Education: LMU Munich; Université Paris VII
- Scientific career
- Fields: Computer science
- Workplaces: LMU Munich; Technical University of Munich; University of Passau
- Thesis: Das Entscheidungsproblem der Prädikatenlogik mit Identität und Funktionszeichen (1976)
- Doctoral advisor: Kurt Schütte

Martin Wirsing (born 24 December 1948 in Bayreuth) is a German computer scientist, and Professor emeritus and former vice president of LMU Munich, Germany.

== Biography ==
Wirsing studied Mathematics at LMU Munich and at Université Paris VII, obtaining the Diplom in Mathematics from LMU Munich and the Mâitrise-ès-Sciences Mathématiques at Université Paris VII. Supervised by Kurt Schütte, he received his PhD from LMU Munich in 1976, with a thesis on a topic in mathematical logic (Das Entscheidungsproblem der Prädikatenlogik mit Identität und Funktionszeichen). From 1975 to 1983, he was a research assistant at the chair of F.L. Bauer at the Technical University of Munich, where he completed his Habilitation in Informatics in 1984. In 1985, Wirsing became full professor and Chair of Informatics at the University of Passau and in 1992 he returned to LMU Munich as the Chair of Programming and Software Engineering. He served several years as Dean, Head of Department and Vice President of the Senate of LMU Munich. From 2010 to 2019, he served as Vice President for Teaching and Studies of LMU Munich. In July 2016, he was awarded a Degree of Doctor of Science (Honoris Causa) by Royal Holloway, University of London.

His research interests comprise software engineering and its formal foundations, autonomous self-aware systems, and digitisation of universities. From 2006 to 2015, he was coordinating the European IP projects SENSORIA (2006 to 2010) on software engineering for service-oriented systems and ASCENS (2010 to 2015) on engineering collective autonomic systems. From 2007 to 2010, Wirsing was the chairman of the Scientific Board of INRIA and from 2014 to 2017 a member of the scientific committee of Institut Mines-Télécom. He was a member of the board of trustees of Max Planck Institute of Psychiatry and of the scientific committees of the University of Bordeaux. Currently, he is a member of the scientific advisory boards of IMDEA Software Institute and of the excellence initiative of Université de Lorraine.

Wirsing is co-editor in chief (together with Bernhard Steffen) of the International Journal on Software Tools for Technology Transfer (STTT) and editor of Electronic Proceedings in Theoretical Computer Science (EPTCS). He previously served on the editorial boards of Theoretical Computer Science (journal) and International Journal of Software and Informatics.

== Selected papers and books ==
- Wirsing, Martin (1978). "Kleine unentscheidbare Klassen der Prädikatenlogik mit Identität und Funktionszeichen" [Small undecidable classes of predicate logic with identity and function symbols]. Archiv für Mathematische Logik und Grundlagenforschung (in German). 19 (1): 97–109. doi:10.1007/BF02011871. S2CID 46605535.
- Broy, Manfred; Wirsing, Martin (1982). "Partial abstract types". Acta Informatica. 18 (1): 47–64. doi:10.1007/BF00625280. S2CID 11391201.
- Wirsing, Martin (1986). "Structured algebraic specifications: A Kernel language". Theoretical Computer Science. 42: 123–249. doi:10.1016/0304-3975(86)90051-4.
- Martin Wirsing: Algebraic Specification. In: J. van Leeuwen (ed.): Handbook of Theoretical Computer Science, Amsterdam, North-Holland, 1990, pp. 675–788 (ISBN 978-0444880741)
- Bauer, Friedrich Ludwig; Wirsing, Martin (March 1991). Elementare Aussagenlogik (in German). Berlin / Heidelberg: Springer-Verlag. ISBN 3-540-52974-8.
- Pietro Cenciarelli, Alexander Knapp, Bernhard Reus, and Martin Wirsing. An Event-Based Structural Operational Semantics of Multi-Threaded Java. In: Jim Alves-Foss (ed.): Formal Syntax and Semantics of Java, Lect. Notes Comp. Sci. 1523, Berlin: Springer, 1999, pp. 157–200 (ISBN 978-3-540-48737-1)
- Iman Poernomo, John Crossley, Martin Wirsing: Adapting Proofs-as-Programs: The Curry—Howard Protocol. Springer Monographs in Computer Science, 2005, 420 pages (ISBN 978-0-387-23759-6)
- Martin Wirsing, Jean-Pierre Banatre, Matthias Hölzl, Axel Rauschmayer (Eds.): Software-Intensive Systems and New Computing Paradigms. Lecture Notes in Computer Science 5380, Springer-Verlag, 2008, 265 pages (ISBN 978-3-540-89436-0)
- Martin Wirsing, Matthias Hölzl (Eds.): Rigorous Software Engineering for Service-Oriented Systems - Results of the SENSORIA Project on Software Engineering for Service-Oriented Computing. Lecture Notes in Computer Science 6582, Springer 2011, 737 pages (ISBN 978-3-642-20400-5)
- Jonas Eckhardt, Tobias Mühlbauer, Musab AlTurki, José Meseguer, Martin Wirsing: Stable Availability under Denial of Service Attacks through Formal Patterns. In: Juan de Lara, Andrea Zisman (Eds.): Fundamental Approaches to Software Engineering - 15th International Conference, FASE 2012. Lecture Notes in Computer Science 7212, Springer 2012, pp. 78–93 (ISBN 978-3-642-28871-5)
- Martin Wirsing, Matthias Hölzl, Nora Koch and Philip Mayer (eds.). Software Engineering for Collective Autonomic Systems: Results of the ASCENS Project, Vol. 8998 LNCS, Springer, 2015, 533 pages (ISBN 978-3-319-16309-3)
- Lenz Belzner, Rolf Hennicker, Martin Wirsing: OnPlan: A Framework for Simulation-Based Online Planning. Christiano Braga, Peter Csaba Ölveczky: Formal Aspects of Component Software - 12th International Conference, FACS 2015, Niterói, Brazil, October 14–16, 2015, Revised Selected Papers. Lecture Notes in Computer Science 9539, Springer 2016, pp. 1–30 (ISBN 978-3-319-28933-5)
