= Manfred Broy =

German computer scientist

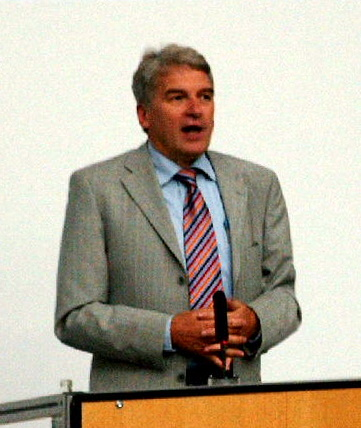
- Manfred Broy in 2004
- Born: 10 August 1949 (age 75); Landsberg am Lech, Germany
- Citizenship: Germany
- Education: Ph.D., 1980
- Scientific career
- Fields: Computer science
- Institutions: University of Passau; Technical University of Munich
- Thesis: Transformation of parallel running programs (1980)
- Doctoral advisor: Friedrich L. Bauer
- Website: www.professoren.tum.de/en/broy-manfred

Manfred Broy (born 10 August 1949) is a German computer scientist, and an emeritus professor in the Department of Informatics at the Technical University of Munich, Garching, Germany.

== Biography ==
Broy gained his Doctor of Philosophy (Ph.D.) in 1980 at the chair of Friedrich L. Bauer on the subject of transformation of programs running in parallel (Transformation parallel ablaufender Programme).

In 1983, he founded the faculty of mathematics and computer science at the University of Passau, which dean he was until 1986. In 1989, he went to the Technical University of Munich (TUM), where in 1992, he became the founding dean of the informatics faculty, which until then was an institute within the faculty of mathematics and informatics. Since then he has been teaching at the Technical University of Munich.

In 2004, he was elected as a fellow of the Gesellschaft für Informatik and in 2007, he won the Konrad Zuse Medal. He is also editor of the International Journal of Software and Informatics. Broy has been a director of the International Summer School Marktoberdorf.

He retired on 31 March 2015.

== Selected books ==
- Broy, Manfred; Jonsson, Bengt; Katoen, Joost-Pieter; Leucker, Martin; Pretschner, Alexander (2005). Model-Based Testing of Reactive Systems: Advanced Lectures. Lecture Notes in Computer Science.
- Broy, Manfred; Denert, Ernst (2002). Software Pioneers.
- Broy, Manfred; Grunbauer, Johannes; Hoare, Tony (2007). Software Systems Reliability and Security. NATO Security through Science Series: Information and Communication Security (Nato Security Through … D: Information and Communication Security). Vol. 9.
- Broy, Manfred; Krüger, Ingolf; Meisinger, Michael (2006). Automotive Software-Connected Services in Mobile Networks: First Automotive Software Workshop, ASWSD 2004. Lecture Notes in Computer Science. San Diego, California, United States.
- Broy, Manfred; Steinbrüggen, Ralf (2000). Calculational System Design. NATO Science Series: Computers & Systems Sciences (NATO ASI Series. Series III, Computer and Systems Sciences) by Germany) NATO Advanced Study Institute on Calculational System Design (1998). Marktoberdorf, Germany.
- Broy, Manfred (1989). Constructive Methods in Computing Science: International Summer School. NATO ASI. Series F, Computer and systems sciences).
- Broy, Manfred (1996). Deductive Program Design. NATO ASI Series: Computer and Systems Sciences.
- Hoare, Tony; Broy, Manfred; Steinbrüggen, Ralf (2001). Engineering Theories of Software Construction. NATO Science Series. Series III, Computer and Systems Sciences, 180) by Germany) NATO Advanced Study Institute on Engineering Theories of Software Construction (2000). Marktoberdorf, Germany).
- Broy, Manfred; Gruenbauer, Johannes; Harel, David; Hoare, Tony (2005). Engineering Theories of Software Intensive Systems. Proceedings of the NATO Advanced Study Institute on Engineering Theories of Software Intensive Systems, … II: Mathematics, Physics and Chemistry – via Kindle.
- Broy, Manfred; Bjørner, Dines; Pottosin, Igor V. (1993). Formal Methods in Programming and their Applications: International Conference Proceedings. Lecture Notes in Computer Science. Academgorodok, Novosibirsk, Russia.
