= Mike Woodger =

English computer scientist (1923–2025)

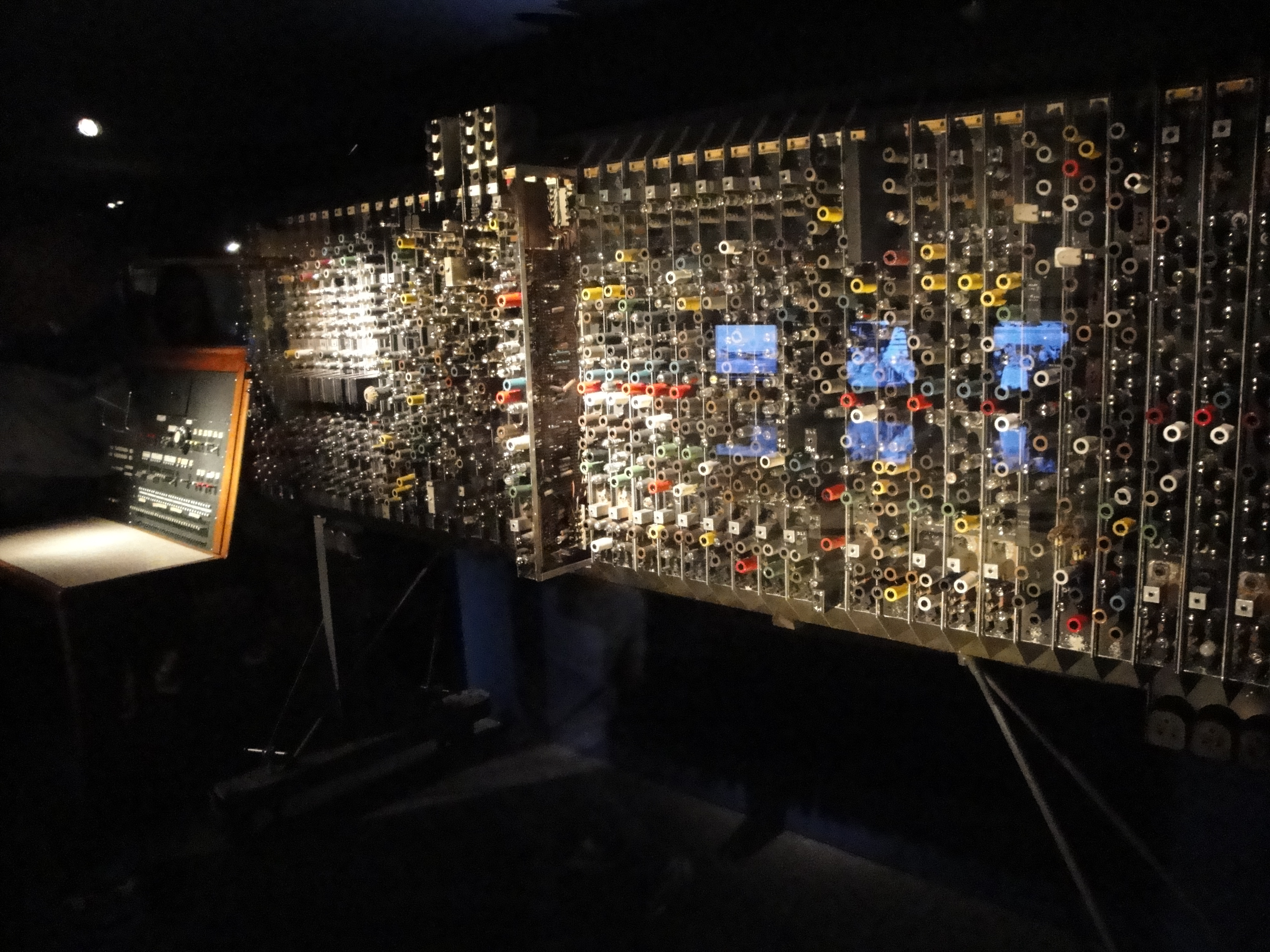
- The Pilot ACE computer, now in the Science Museum, London
- Born: 28 March 1923; Epsom, Surrey, England
- Died: 14 July 2025 (aged 102)
- Citizenship: British
- Education: University College London
- Known for: Pilot ACE; ALGOL 60; Ada (programming language)
- Scientific career
- Fields: Computer science
- Workplaces: National Physical Laboratory

Michael Woodger (28 March 1923 - 14 July 2025) was an English pioneering computer scientist who spent most of his career at the National Physical Laboratory (NPL) in Teddington, London. Beginning his computing career as an assistant to Alan Turing in 1946, he played an important role in the development and application of the Pilot ACE and full ACE computers, and later contributed to the design and documentation of the ALGOL 60 and Ada programming languages. In April 2023, on the occasion of his 100th birthday, he was named an Honorary Fellow of The National Museum of Computing (TNMOC).

== Early life and education ==
Woodger was born in Epsom, Surrey, on 28 March 1923, the eldest of four children. His father, the theoretical biologist Joseph Henry Woodger (1894-1981), was professor of biology at the University of London and was known for his work on building a foundation of mathematical logic for biology, drawing on Whitehead and Russell's Principia Mathematica. The elder Woodger taught his son symbolic logic from an early age, providing Mike with an unusually rigorous early grounding in formal methods.

Woodger graduated in mathematics from University College London in 1943 and then worked at the Ministry of Supply on military applications for the remainder of World War II.

== Career at NPL ==
In May 1946, Woodger joined the newly established Mathematics Division at the National Physical Laboratory in west London. After a short period of training in numerical analysis, the main subject of the Division's work, he was introduced to Turing's plans for the ACE computer and John von Neumann's plans for the EDVAC.

=== Work with Turing on the ACE ===
Woodger assisted Turing with the detailed logical design of the ACE and with experimental hardware work, the latter including an unsuccessful attempt to construct an acoustic delay-line store using the air column in a drainpipe. He later recalled Turing as kind, shy and encouraging, and that the two shared a strong common interest in logic.

=== Pilot ACE ===
After Turing's departure from NPL in 1947, and following the laboratory's recruitment of staff with pulse-electronics experience, the development of a reduced version of the ACE design known as the Pilot ACE was undertaken in earnest, becoming operational in 1950. Woodger's principal role was the writing of standard procedures for mathematical operations for the new machine, which were tested and put to use on Pilot ACE's first operational runs.

He went on to develop an automatic system for handling matrices in the machine's small main store, which made the manipulation of arrays of mathematical data accessible to users unfamiliar with the machine-level code of Pilot ACE and incorporated space-saving and error-checking features. The system was subsequently rewritten for the English Electric DEUCE, the commercial successor to Pilot ACE, and in that form was widely used into the 1960s. Woodger's matrix-handling system is considered an early practical step toward the development of high-level programming languages.

== Programming languages ==
=== ALGOL 60 ===
Woodger was one of the joint authors of the 1960 Report on the Algorithmic Language ALGOL 60, the foundational specification of the ALGOL 60 programming language and a widely cited milestone in the history of programming-language design. His role on the International ALGOL Committee, alongside Peter Naur and the other contributors, lay particularly in organising the committee's discussions and in capturing the language definition in precise written form. Woodger was later a long-serving chair of IFIP Working Group 2.3 on Programming Methodology, the international forum for discussion of programming-methodology research, where he advocated for the principle that a large program is best constructed as a hierarchy of modules in which each level uses the services of the level below and provides services to the level above; he argued that programming-language design should reflect these structural principles, with each level expressed in its own appropriate terminology.

=== Ada ===
From the late 1970s, Woodger acted as a consultant to a consortium led by CII-Honeywell Bull that was developing the language initially called Green, one of four contenders short-listed in the United States Department of Defense competition to define a single high-order programming language for defence applications. The language was renamed Ada in 1979 after winning the competition. He continued working on Ada documentation through the French company Alsys S.A., founded by the Ada designer Jean Ichbiah, both before and after his retirement from NPL in 1983; this part-time consultancy ended in 1991. Ichbiah described him as "an artist of technical writing."

== Later life and honours ==
Woodger maintained a personal archive of historical computing documents throughout his career; on his retirement from NPL the historical portion of this collection was transferred to the library of the Science Museum in South Kensington for research access.

In April 2023, on the occasion of his 100th birthday, Woodger was made an Honorary Fellow of The National Museum of Computing at Bletchley Park in recognition of his work on Pilot ACE, ALGOL 60 and Ada. He died on 14 July 2025, aged 102.

== Selected publications ==
- Woodger, M. (1951). "Automatic Computing Engine of the National Physical Laboratory". Nature. 167 (4244): 270. doi:10.1038/167270a0
- Naur, Peter; Backus, John; et al. (1960). "Report on the Algorithmic Language ALGOL 60". Communications of the ACM. (Woodger one of 13 joint authors.)
- Woodger, M. (1972). "On Semantic Levels in Programming". In Freiman, C. V. (ed.). Information Processing 71: Proc. IFIP Congress 71, Ljubljana, August 1971. Amsterdam: North-Holland. pp. 402-407.
