= Jules Schwartz =

American computer scientist

Jules I. Schwartz (June 26, 1927 – June 6, 2013) was an American computer scientist chiefly known for his creation of the JOVIAL programming language.

He served in the United States Army in both World War II and the Korean War. He attended graduate school at Columbia University, where he received a Master of Arts in Mathematics in 1961. At Columbia Schwartz became acquainted with some early computers at the IBM Thomas J. Watson Research Center in New York. In 1954 he joined RAND Corporation where he developed utility software for the JOHNNIAC computer and worked on PACT compiler for the IBM 704. In 1955 he joined the MIT Lincoln Laboratory to work on the SAGE computer.

Schwartz went with System Development Corporation (SDC) when it was spun off from RAND in 1957. At SDC he helped develop the JOVIAL programming language in 1959-1960 —the acronym standing for Jules Own Version of the International Algorithmic Language, although Schwartz claimed this was originally a joke.

After this he worked on the AN/FSQ-32 computer system and other projects, eventually becoming director of technology at SDC. In 1970 he began working at Computer Sciences Corporation (CSC).
