= Charles Katz =

American computer programmer (1927–1974)

- Born: July 7, 1927; Philadelphia, Pennsylvania, U.S.
- Died: May 9, 1974 (aged 46); Rockville, Maryland, U.S.
- Education: B.S., Temple University (1950); M.S., University of Pennsylvania (1953)
- Known for: A-0 System; ALGOL 58; ALGOL 60
- Scientific career
- Fields: Computer science Mathematics
- Institutions: Remington Rand; General Electric; Burroughs Corporation; Xerox

Charles Abraham Katz (July 7, 1927 – May 9, 1974) was an American mathematician and computer scientist known for his contributions to early compiler development in the 1950s.

Katz received two degrees in mathematics, a Bachelor of Science (B.S.) at Temple University in 1950, and a Master of Science (M.S.) at the University of Pennsylvania in 1953. He then went to work at Remington Rand, in the UNIVAC division, with Grace Hopper to develop compilers for her A-0 system UNIVAC programming languages starting with A-2, followed by MATH-MATIC and FLOW-MATIC. He then went on to General Electric, Burroughs Corporation, and Xerox.

In 1958, he served as one of the original four American members of the International Federation for Information Processing (IFIP) IFIP Working Group 2.1 on Algorithmic Languages and Calculi, which specified, supports, and maintains the languages ALGOL 60 and ALGOL 68.

Katz died in Rockville, Maryland on May 9, 1974, at the age of 46.
