= Joseph Henry Wegstein =

American computer scientist

- Born: April 7, 1922; Washburn, Illinois, United States
- Died: August 16, 1985 (aged 63)
- Resting place: Frederick, Maryland, United States
- Education: University of Illinois (B.S., 1944; M.S., 1948)
- Known for: ALGOL 58, ALGOL 60, data processing technical standards, fingerprint analysis
- Scientific career
- Institutions: National Bureau of Standards

Joseph Henry Wegstein (April 7, 1922 – August 16, 1985) was an American computer scientist.

== Biography ==
Wegstein was born on April 7, 1922 in Washburn, Illinois. He attended the University of Illinois, where he earned a Bachelor of Science (B.S.) degree in physics in 1944, and graduated with a Master of Science (M.S.) in engineering physics in 1948. He worked as Acting Chief of the Office for Information Processing Standards, at the National Bureau of Standards, now National Institute of Standards and Technology (NIST), where he specialized in technical standards for automatic data processing, especially in the technology of fingerprint recognition.

He participated in conferences in Zürich in 1958 and Paris in 1960 which developed the programming languages ALGOL 58 and ALGOL 60, respectively.

He was involved with international standards in programming and informatics, in at least two groups.

He was a member of the International Federation for Information Processing (IFIP) IFIP Working Group 2.1 on Algorithmic Languages and Calculi, which specified, maintains, and supports the languages ALGOL 60 and 68.

He was a member of the Conference/Committee on Data Systems Languages (CODASYL) committee, and involved in developing the COBOL language.

== Publications ==
- Wegstein, Joseph Henry (1968). A computer oriented single-fingerprint identification system (Report).
- Wegstein, Joseph Henry (1969). A semi-automated single fingerprint identification system (Report).
- Wegstein, Joseph Henry (1970). Automated fingerprint identification (Report).
- Wegstein, Joseph Henry (1972). Manual and Computerized footprint identification (Report).
- Wegstein, Joseph Henry (1975). The M40 fingerprint matcher (Report).
