= Gunther Schmidt =

German mathematician (born 1939)

- Born: 1939 (age 86–87)
- Occupation: mathematician

Gunther Schmidt (born 1939, Rüdersdorf) is a German mathematician who works also in informatics.

== Life ==
Schmidt began studying Mathematics in 1957 at the University of Göttingen. His academic teachers were in particular Kurt Reidemeister, Wilhelm Klingenberg and Karl Stein. In 1960, he transferred to the Ludwig-Maximilians-Universität München (LMU) where he studied functions of several complex variables with Karl Stein. Schmidt wrote a thesis on analytic continuation of such functions.

In 1962, Schmidt began work at the Technical University of Munich with students of Robert Sauer, in the beginning in labs and tutorials, later in mentoring and administration. Schmidt's interests turned toward programming when he collaborated with Hans Langmaack on rewriting and the braid group in 1969. Friedrich L. Bauer and Klaus Samelson were establishing software engineering at the university and Schmidt joined their group in 1974. In 1977, he submitted his Habilitation "Programs as partial graphs".

He became a professor in 1980. Shortly after that, he was appointed to hold the chair of the late Klaus Samelson for one and a half years. From 1988 until his retirement in 2004, he held a professorship at the Faculty for Computer Science of the University of the Bundeswehr Munich. He was a classroom instructor for beginners courses as well as special courses in mathematical logic, semantics of programming languages, construction of compilers, and algorithmic languages. Working with Thomas Ströhlein, he authored a textbook on relations and graphs, published in German in 1989 and English in 1993. In 2011, the volume on Relational Mathematics followed in the Encyclopedia of Mathematics and Its Applications of Cambridge University Press.

In 2001, he became involved in a large project (17 nations) with the European Cooperation in Science and Technology: Schmidt was chairman of project COST 274 TARSKI (Theory and Application of Relational Structures as Knowledge Instruments).

In 2014, a festschrift was organized to celebrate his 75th year.

The calculus of relations had a relatively low profile among mathematical topics in the twentieth century, but Schmidt and others have raised that profile. The partial order of binary relations can be organized by grouping through closure. In 2018, Schmidt and Michael Winter published Relational Topology which reviews classical mathematical structures, such as binary operations and topological space, through the lens of calculus of relations.

== Work ==
In 1981, he participated in the International Summer School Marktoberdorf, and edited the lecture notes Theoretical Foundations of Programming Methodology with Manfred Broy.

Gunther Schmidt is mainly known for his work on Relational Mathematics; he was co-founder of the RAMiCS conference series in 1994.

His textbooks on calculus of relations exhibit applications and potential of algebraic logic.

== Books ==
- 1989: (with Thomas Ströhlein) Relationen und Graphen, Mathematik für Informatiker, Springer Verlag, ISBN 3-540-50304-8, ISBN 0-387-50304-8
- 1993: (with Thomas Ströhlein) Relations and Graphs Discrete Mathematics for Computer Scientists, EATCS Monographs on Theoretical Computer Science, Springer Verlag, ISBN 3-540-56254-0
- 2011: Relational Mathematics, Encyclopedia of Mathematics and its Applications, vol. 132, Cambridge University Press ISBN 978-0-521-76268-7
- 2018: (with M. Winter) Relational Topology, Lecture Notes in Mathematics vol. 2208, Springer Verlag, ISBN 978-3-319-74451-3
- 2020: Rückblick auf die Anfänge der Münchner Informatik, Die blaue Stunde der Informatik, Springer-Vieweg, ISBN 978-3-658-28754-2, ISBN 978-3-658-28755-9
- 2023: Mathematik als Wissenschaft in der Gesellschaft, Springer-Spektrum, ISBN 978-3-662-67897-8

== Editorships ==
- 2006: (with de Swart, H. C. M., Orłowska, E., and Roubens, M.) Theory and Application of Relational Structures as Knowledge Instruments II, Wrap-up volume of the COST Action 274: TARSKI, Lecture Notes in Computer Science #4342, Springer ISBN 3-540-69223-1, ISBN 978-3-540-69223-2
- 2003: (with de Swart, H. C. M., Orłowska, E., and Roubens, M.) Theory and Application of Relational Structures as Knowledge Instruments, Kickoff volume of the COST Action 274: TARSKI, Lecture Notes in Computer Science #2929, Springer, ISBN 3-540-20780-5
- 2001: (with Parnas, D., Kahl, W.) Relational Methods in Software, Special Issue of Electronic Notes in Theoretical Computer Science,, vol. 44, numbers 3, ISSN 1571-0661
- 1999: (with Jaoua, A.) Relational Methods in Computer Science, Special Issue of Information Sciences, vol. 119, numbers 3+4, Elsevier
- 1997: with Brink, C., Kahl, W.: Relational Methods in Computer Science, Advances in Computing Science. Springer ISBN 3-211-82971-7
- 1994: (with Mayr, E. W., and Tinhofer, G.) Graph-Theoretic Concepts in Computer Science, vol. 903 of Lecture Notes in Computer Science, Proc. 20th Intern. Workshop WG '94, Jun 17–19, Herrsching, Springer 1994, ISBN 3-540-59071-4
- 1991: (with Berghammer, R.) Graph-Theoretic Concepts in Computer Science, vol. 570 of Lecture Notes in Computer Science, Proc. 17th Intern. Workshop WG '91, Jun 17-19, Richterheim Fischbachau, Springer 1991, ISBN 3-540-55121-2, ISBN 0-387-55121-2
- 1987: (with Tinhofer, G) Graph-Theoretic Concepts in Computer Science vol. 246 of Lecture Notes in Computer Science, Proc. 12th Intern. Workshop WG '86, Jun 17–19, Kloster Bernried, Springer, ISBN 3-540-17218-1, ISBN 0-387-17218-1
- 1982: (with Broy, M.) Theoretical Foundations of Programming Methodology. Reidel Publishers, ISBN 90-277-1460-6.
- 1981: (with Bauer, F. L.) Erinnerungen an Robert Sauer, Beiträge zum Gedächtniskolloquium anläßlich seines 10. Todestages, Springer
