= Dianne Nelmes =

British former television executive

Dianne Gwenllian Nelmes (born 6 March 1951) is a British former television executive and television producer, who created well-known ITV light entertainment television series.

== Early life ==
She attended Holt County Girls' Grammar School (since September 1974 the comprehensive The Holt School) in Wokingham, where in 1970 she gained A-levels in Economics, English Literature, and History.

She was the editor of the Newcastle University student newspaper from October to November 1972, where in 1973 she gained a degree in economics and politics. She was president of the Newcastle University Students' Union from 1973 to 1974.

== Career ==
She started as a writer for the Newcastle Journal.

=== BBC ===
She was with the BBC for four years from 1978 to 1983, with Look North at Newcastle. She joined Granada in 1983.

=== Granada ===
At Granada she was responsible for Stars in their Eyes and You've Been Framed.

In January 1992 she became head of news and regional programmes for ITV in the south and south-east. But in late 1992, she returned to Granada, becoming head of a new factual department, replacing Stuart Prebble. Stuart Prebble had also been student union president of Newcastle University, and Dianne had replaced him, when he had moved on from Look North; Prebble had been the student newspaper editor in October 1971. in this new department she worked with Charles Tremayne.

In autumn 1996 she launched Granada Sky Broadcasting (since 2004 it was called ITV Digital Channels).

=== ITV ===
In late 1997 she became ITV's head of daytime broadcasting, introducing many new programmes on 23 March 1998.

In March 2000 became head of documentaries at ITV, being replaced by Maureen Duffy, from the BBC, as head of ITV Daytime from July 2000.

== Personal life ==
She married another ITV producer in 1986.
