= Rudolf Berghammer =

German mathematician

Rudolf Berghammer (Born in 1952, Oberndorf, Bavaria, Germany) is a German mathematician who works in computer science.

== Life ==
Rudolf Berghammer worked as an electrician at the Farbwerke Hoechst, Kelheim, from 1966 until 1970. He began studying Mathematics and Computer Science in 1973 at the Technical University of Munich (TUM). His academic teachers were Friedrich L. Bauer, Klaus Samelson, Gottfried Tinhofer, and Gunther Schmidt. After obtaining his diploma in 1979, he started working as an assistant mainly to Gunther Schmidt and Friedrich L. Bauer at TUM where he obtained his award-winning Ph.D. in 1984. From 1988 on, he worked as an assistant to Gunther Schmidt at the Faculty for Computer Science of the University of the Bundeswehr Munich, where he finally got his habilitation in 1990. Since 1993, he is a professor for Computer-aided Program Development at the Department of Computer Science at Kiel University.

== Work ==
For many years he has served as head of the steering committee of the international RAMiCS conference series (formerly termed RelMiCS).

Rudolf Berghammer is known for his work in relational mathematics, or Formal Methods of Programming, Semantics, Relational Methods in Computer Science. He developed the RelView system for the manipulation and visualisation of relations and relational programming.

For instance, in 2019, he was coauthor of "Cryptomorphic topological structures: a computational relation algebraic approach". This work relates the classical neighborhood system approach to topology to closure operators, kernel operators, and Aumann contact relations. The formulation of one approach to another is done with calculus of relations. The article notes the contributions of RelView experiments with finite topologies, for instance for a set with seven elements, 9,535,241 topologies are tested. (see § 9).

== Personal ==
One of Berghammer's hobbies is mountaineering. In his youth he climbed Ortler or Piz Bernina and other noted summits. He actively spends several days climbing in the alps every year. Furthermore, he is a sailor who owns a sailing vessel in the Baltic Sea.

== Written books ==
- Semantik von Programmiersprachen, Logos Verlag, 2001, ISBN 978-3-89722-830-6
- Ordnungen, Verbände und Relationen mit Anwendungen, Springer, ISBN 3658006196
- Mathematik für Informatiker: Grundlegende Begriffe und Strukturen, Springer, ISBN 978-3-658-06287-3, ISBN 978-3-658-06288-0 (eBook)

== Editorships ==
- 1991: (with Gunther Schmidt) Graph-Theoretic Concepts in Computer Science, Lecture Notes in Computer Science #570, Proc. 17th Intern. Workshop WG '91, Richterheim Fischbachau, ISBN 3-540-55121-2, ISBN 0-387-55121-2
- 2003: Berghammer, R.; Möller, B.; Struth, G., eds. (2004-06-01), RelMiCS '7 – Relational and Kleene-Algebraic Methods in Computer Science, Lecture Notes in Computer Science, vol. 3051, ISBN 978-3-540-22145-6.
- 2008: Berghammer, R.; Möller, B.; Struth, G., eds. (2008-03-28), RelMiCS '10 – Relations and Kleene-Algebra in Computer Science, Lecture Notes in Computer Science, vol. 4988, ISBN 978-3-540-78912-3.
- 2009: Berghammer, R.; Jaoua, A.; Möller, B., eds. (2009-10-05), RAMiCS '11 – Relations and Kleene Algebra in Computer Science, Lecture Notes in Computer Science, vol. 5827, ISBN 978-3-642-04638-4.
- 2014: Berghammer, R.; Möller, B.; Winter, M. (eds.), "Festschrift in Honour of Gunther Schmidt on the Occasion of his 75th Birthday", Journal of Logical and Algebraic Methods in Programming, 83 (2).
