= Into =

Into, entering or changing form, may also refer to:

- INTO University Partnerships, a British business
- Into (album), an album by the Rasmus
- Into (magazine), a digital magazine formerly owned by Grindr
- Into, a male Finnish name
- Irish National Teachers' Organisation

== Mathematics ==
- Into, referring to the codomain of a mathematical functions, as in "F : A -> B" means F maps A into B
- Into, used as a multiplier in mathematical jargon in Indian English (3 into 3 = 9)
