= Brian Thomson (journalist) =

British-Australian journalist

Brian Thomson (born 1965 in Kirkcaldy, Fife, Scotland) is the former Senior Correspondent of SBS World News (World News Australia). He is currently SBS' International Editor.

== Education ==
Thomson was educated at Kirkcaldy High School, a comprehensive state school in Kirkcaldy, Fife, Scotland, before studying Politics and History at Newcastle University, where he was Deputy President of the Newcastle University Union Society. He went on to gain a postgraduate diploma in radio and television journalism at the Lancashire Polytechnic (now the University of Central Lancashire).

== Life and career ==
Thomson joined Radio Forth in 1989 as a News Reporter and in 1992 moved to Sky News where he was Scotland Correspondent. From 1994 to 1997 Thomson worked as a freelance journalist for Reuters Television in Bangkok, Thailand and for GMTV in London, England. In 1997 Thomson emigrated to Sydney, Australia, where he joined SBS as Senior Producer. In 2006 Thomson became Senior Correspondent for SBS World News (World News Australia). In 2015 he became the network's International Editor.

== Reporting ==
Thomson started his international career reporting on the First Gulf War, travelling between Saudi Arabia and Kuwait. He has since reported from more than 20 countries, covering conflicts in East Timor (the 2006 East Timorese crisis), Indonesia ( the downfall of Suharto), Thailand, Fiji (2006 Fijian coup d’état), Papua New Guinea, and Egypt (2011 Egyptian protests), elections in Nepal (2008 Nepalese Constituent Assembly election), the United States of America (2008 United States Presidential election and 2012, the United Kingdom (2010 general election), Australia (2007 federal election) and Zimbabwe (2008 Zimbabwean presidential election), on sports in China (2008 Summer Olympics), Germany (2006 FIFA World Cup), and South Africa (2010 FIFA World Cup), and on major events including the Inauguration of Barack Obama and the death of Nelson Mandela. He has also covered a number of natural disasters.

== Awards ==
Walkley Award for Sports Reporting 2006 (commended), Walkley Award for Television News 2007 (winner), Logie Award for TV News Reporting 2008 and 2012 (finalist), United Nations Association of Australia Media Peace Award 2011 (winner).

== Miscellaneous ==
Thomson attracted attention by attending the 2008 Logie Awards dressed in a kilt.
