= Parm Sandhu =

British policewoman

Parm Jit Kaur Sandhu (born 1963 in Birmingham, United Kingdom) is a former Chief Superintendent in Britain's Metropolitan Police Service. After 30 years of service, she became the first non-white woman to be promoted through the ranks to chief superintendent.

== Biography ==
Sandhu worked for the West Bromwich Building Society (1983–1984) and the civil service (1985–1989) before becoming a career police officer in London in 1989. From 1989 to 1994 she worked across East London Boroughs involved in mainly hate and domestic violence investigations, and was given responsibility for Community and Youth involvement Police Volunteer Cadets and Young people vulnerable from being involved in crime. After the 7 July 2005 London bombings she worked in the Diamond Initiative groups to assist the Metropolitan Police Service shape its response and create links with community groups.

In 2006, she received the Public Sector Award at the Asian Women of Achievements Awards in London.

In 2016, Sandhu became Borough Commander for Richmond.

In 2018, Sandhu and two other senior officers were the subject of a gross misconduct investigation in relation to the awarding of a royal honour and allegations that Sandhu had encouraged colleagues to support her nomination for a Queen’s Police Medal (QPM). She was cleared of gross misconduct some 12 months later and then sued the MPS and agreed a confidential settlement. She retired from the Police Service the following year.

Her memoirs were published by Atlantic Books in June 2021. Black and Blue: One Woman's Story of Policing and Prejudice was co-written with investigative journalist Stuart Prebble. As part of its publication, Sandhu is on record seeking change within policing to respect and increase diversity and has stated that the MPS remains 'institutionally racist'.

== Honours ==

Ribbon	Description	Notes
	Queen Elizabeth II Golden Jubilee Medal	2002; UK Version of this Medal
	Queen Elizabeth II Diamond Jubilee Medal	2012; UK Version of this Medal
	Police Long Service and Good Conduct Medal	
