= Stuart Prebble =

British television executive (1951–2025)

Stuart Colin Prebble (15 April 1951 – 21 August 2025) was a British television executive who was Chairman of Storyvault Films, and was CEO of ITV, Granada Sky Broadcasting and of ITV Digital.

== Early life and career ==
Prebble was educated at Newcastle University, where he was editor of student newspaper The Courier and later president of the students' union. After leaving university he was producer and editor of the World In Action current affairs series and went on to be Head of Factual Programmes at Granada TV and Controller of Factual Programmes for the ITV network. He was nominated for a BAFTA TV Award for Best Factual Series for World in Action and won the RTS "best factual series" award for Network First.

He was promoted to CEO of ITV in April, 2001, after ITV struggled to find a replacement CEO for well over a year. In March 2002 he was CEO of ITV Digital when it was forced into administration. In 2000, Prebble had agreed to pay £315 million over three years for TV rights to the Football League, but low user penetration, a conflict over carriage rights with Sky and high debt led ITV Digital's parent investors to walk away.

In Autumn 2002 he left ITV to set up an independent television production company based in London and the North East called Liberty Bell. The company produced a wide range of factual programmes for all of the UK terrestrial broadcasters. He was the executive producer and writer of the 2003 - 2004 Grumpy Old Men series for BBC2. There were three series of Grumpy Old Men, and his company also made several series of Grumpy Old Women which also became a successful touring stage show. Other TV productions for Liberty Bell have included 3 Men in a Boat for BBC2, Why We Went to War for More4, The Alastair Campbell Diaries for BBC2, and Willie's Wonky Chocolate Factory for Channel 4.

Prebble eventually sold Liberty Bell Productions to Avalon and in summer of 2011 he left to set up another TV production company, StoryVault Films. Among the company's productions are "Portrait Artist of the Year" and "Landscape Artist of the Year" series for Sky Arts.

Prebble was the author of 11 published books. These include two early novels, A Power in the Land, and The Lazarus File, as well as five comedy books on "Grumpy" themes. Secrets of the Conqueror, which is about the Falklands and the Cold War, was published by Faber in October 2012. His novel The Insect Farm was published by Alma Books in the UK in March 2015, and in the US by Mulholland Books in July 2015. He is the co-author of "Black and Blue" with Parm Sandhu, who was the most senior female BAME officer when she retired from the Met in 2019.

== Personal life and death ==
Prebble was married three times. Firstly to Barbara Gifford (1973–1978), then to Marilyn Charlton (1978-2020), and finally to Samantha Richards (from 2020). He died from pancreatic cancer on 21 August 2025, at the age of 74.
