= James Wright (classicist) =

James Robertson Graeme Wright CBE DL (born 14 June 1939) is a former Vice-Chancellor of Newcastle University.

== Career ==
Educated at Inverness Royal Academy, the High School of Dundee and the University of Edinburgh, Wright became a lecturer at the University of Edinburgh in 1966. He went on to be a Fellow at St Catharine's College, Cambridge in 1978, Secretary-General of Faculties at the University of Cambridge in 1987 and Vice-Chancellor of Newcastle University in 1991.

After retiring from Newcastle University in 2000 he became Chairman of Age Concern.

Academic offices
Preceded by Laurence Martin	Vice-Chancellor of the University of Newcastle upon Tyne; 1991–2000	Succeeded by Christopher Edwards
