= RAMiCS =

- Abbreviation: RAMiCS
- Discipline: Theoretical computer science

Publication details
- Publisher: Springer LNCS
- History: 1994–
- Frequency: 18 monthly (since 1994)

RAMiCS, the International Conference on Relational and Algebraic Methods in Computer Science, is an academic conference organized every eighteen months by an international steering committee and held in different locations mainly in Europe, but also in other continents. Like most theoretical computer science conferences, its contributions are strongly peer-reviewed. Proceedings of the conferences appear in Lecture Notes in Computer Science, and some of the stronger papers have been published in Journal of Logical and Algebraic Methods in Programming.

== Early history ==
RAMiCS, then still called RelMiCS, was first organized by Chris Brink and Gunther Schmidt on January 17–21, 1994 in Schloß Dagstuhl, Germany as International Seminar on Relational Methods in Computer Science. The second RelMiCS was organized by the late Armando Haeberer and held July 10–14, 1995 in Paraty near Rio de Janeiro, Brazil. The 3rd International Seminar on the Use of Relational Methods in Computer Science (RelMiCS 3) was January 6–10, 1997 in Albatros Hotel in Hammamet, Tunisia. A 4th International Seminar on Relational Methods in Computer Science (RelMiCS 4) took place September 14–20, 1998 in Stefan Banach International Mathematical Centre, Sept. 2004, Warsaw, Poland. The 5th International Seminar on Relational Methods in Computer Science (RelMiCS 5) occurred January 9–14, 2000 at Valcartier near Québec, Canada. From that point on, publication was arranged with Springer in the series Lecture Notes in Computer Science.

== See also ==
- Calculus of relations
- Binary relation
- Heterogeneous relation
- List of computer science conferences
