= Henry Miller (clinician) =

Henry George Miller (3 December 1913 – 25 August 1976) was Vice-Chancellor of Newcastle University.

== Career ==
Miller was born in Chesterfield, Derbyshire and studied medicine at Newcastle College of Medicine, now part of Newcastle University, from 1931 to 1937. Whilst there he served as secretary (1935–36) and president (1936-37) of the students' union. He spent time working at the Royal Victoria Infirmary in Newcastle, the Johns Hopkins Hospital in the United States and Great Ormond Street Hospital in London, before serving in the Royal Air Force during the Second World War.

He returned to Newcastle after the war and became a Reader in Neurology at Newcastle University in 1961. He went on to be Professor of Medicine (Neurology) in 1964, Dean of Medicine in 1966 and Vice Chancellor in 1968. He notably said:

"the psychiatrist must be first and foremost and all the time a physician... In fact, psychiatry is neurology without physical signs, and calls for diagnostic virtuosity of the highest order... The simple fact (is) that a psychiatrist is a physician who takes a proper history at the first consultation"

He died in office in 1976.

Academic offices
Preceded by Charles Bosanquet	Vice-Chancellor of the University of Newcastle upon Tyne; 1968–1976	Succeeded by Laurence Martin
