= Laurence Martin =

British academic (1928–2022)

Sir Laurence Woodward Martin DL (30 July 1928 – 24 April 2022) was a British academic who was the vice-chancellor of Newcastle University from 1978 to 1990.

== Life and career ==
Martin was born in St Austell, Cornwall, England on 30 July 1928. Educated at St Austell Grammar School, Christ's College, Cambridge and Yale University, Martin joined the Royal Air Force as a Flying Officer in 1948. He married Betty Parnall in 1956 with whom he had two children.

He became Dean of the Faculty of Social Sciences at the University of Wales in 1966, and was appointed Professor of War Studies at King's College, London in 1968, Vice-Chancellor of Newcastle University in 1978 and Director of the Royal Institute of International Affairs in 1991. In 1981, he gave the Reith Lectures on the theme The Two-Edged Sword. He was appointed Deputy Lieutenant of Tyne and Wear in 1987. He was knighted in 1994.

Martin died from pancreatic cancer in Harborne, Birmingham, on 24 April 2022, aged 93.

== Works ==
- Considerations affecting an extension of the test ban, 1966

Academic offices
Preceded by Sir Michael Howard	Head of Department of War Studies, KCL; 1968–1978	Succeeded by Wolf Mendl
Preceded by Henry Miller	Vice-Chancellor of the University of Newcastle upon Tyne; 1978–1990	Succeeded by James Wright
