= Christopher Edwards (clinician) =

Former Vice-Chancellor of Newcastle University

Sir Christopher Edwards
- Born: Christopher Richard Watkin Edwards; 12 February 1942 (age 84); Banbury, Oxfordshire
- Education: Christ's College, Cambridge
- Scientific career
- Fields: Medicine; Endocrinology
- Workplaces: St Bartholomew's Hospital; University of Edinburgh; Imperial College School of Medicine; Newcastle University
- Website: Official website

Sir Christopher Richard Watkin Edwards FRSE FMedSci (born 12 February 1942) is a former Vice-Chancellor of Newcastle University.

== Career ==
Educated at Marlborough College and Christ's College, Cambridge, Edwards became senior lecturer in medicine at St Bartholomew's Hospital in London in 1975, Professor of Medicine at the University of Edinburgh in 1980 and Dean of the Faculty of Medicine at the University of Edinburgh in 1991. He was appointed the first Principal of the Imperial College School of Medicine in 1995 before becoming Vice-Chancellor of Newcastle University in 2001.

After retiring from Newcastle University in 2007 he became Chairman of the Chelsea & Westminster NHS Foundation Trust. Since 2012 he has also been a trustee at the Planet Earth Institute.

He was appointed a knight bachelor in the 2008 Birthday Honours.

Academic offices
Preceded by James Wright	Vice-Chancellor of the University of Newcastle upon Tyne; 2001–2007	Succeeded by Chris Brink
