= Chris Brink =

South African mathematician and academic administrator

Chris Brink CBE, FRSSAf

Vice-Chancellor Newcastle University
- In office July 2007 – December 2016
- Preceded by: Sir Christopher Edwards
- Succeeded by: Chris Day

Rector and Vice-Chancellor Stellenbosch University
- In office 2002–2007
- Preceded by: van Wyk, A.H.
- Succeeded by: Botman, H.R.

Personal details
- Born: 31 January 1951 (age 75)
- Education: Rand Afrikaans University; Rhodes University; University of Cambridge

Chris Brink (born 31 January 1951) is a South African mathematician and academic. He was the Vice-Chancellor of Newcastle University between 2007 and December 2016.

== Career ==
After graduating with a degree in maths and computer science from Rand Afrikaans University, Brink undertook post-graduate study at Rhodes University and the University of Cambridge. He became professor and head of mathematics and applied mathematics at the University of Cape Town in 1995, pro-vice-chancellor (research) at the University of Wollongong in 1999 and rector and vice-chancellor of Stellenbosch University in 2002 before being appointed vice-chancellor of Newcastle University in 2007.

In the 1980s Chris Brink was a senior research fellow at the Australian National University. In 1994 he joined with Gunther Schmidt to organize at Dagstuhl the initial RAMiCS conference on the calculus of relations. In 1996 The Foundation for Research Development in South Africa rated Chris Brink in category A. He is a fellow of the Royal Society of South Africa, a former president of the South African Mathematical Society, a founder member of the Academy of Science of South Africa and a former chair of the Advisory Board of the African Institute of Mathematical Sciences.

He chaired the Student Policy Network (part of Universities UK) and the N8 Research Partnership, a group of eight research-intensive universities in the North of England. Nationally he has served on the Board of the Equality Challenge Unit (including two years as a Co-Chair), the Board of the Quality Assurance Agency (and its Advisory Committee on Degree-Awarding Powers), and the Advisory Committee on Leadership, Governance and Management of the Higher Education Funding Council for England.

In November 2015, it was announced that Brink would be retiring in December 2016. He was succeeded by Professor Chris Day, the Pro-Vice-Chancellor for the Faculty of Medical Sciences at Newcastle, in January 2017.

Since 2017 Brink has served on the University Grants Committee (Hong Kong), where he convened the 2020 Research Assessment Exercise Group and currently convenes the Research Group. His book The Soul of a University – Why excellence is not enough was published by Bristol University Press in July 2018. It deals with the role of universities in society, and elaborates on the two key questions he became known for while at Newcastle University: ‘What are we good at?’, and ‘What are we good for?’ He was appointed a CBE in the Queen's Birthday Honours List in 2018. In 2021 Brink published an edited volume The Responsive University and the Crisis in South Africa, with Brill/Sense Publishers. The book argues that beyond the now-standard practice of universities’ engagement with society, the more pressing question is how they actually respond to societal challenges. Half the contributing authors are from South Africa and the other half from around the world.

== Work in mathematics ==
Chris Brink developed the study of Boolean modules over relation algebras. He focused on formal aspects of computer science with emphasis on program semantics and Popper's concept of verisimilitude and on the universal-algebraic concept of power structures.

Academic offices
Preceded by Christopher Edwards	Vice-Chancellor of the University of Newcastle upon Tyne; 2007–2016	Succeeded by Chris Day
