= Newcastle University Students' Union =

Coordinates: 54°58′44″N 1°36′54″W

- Institution: Newcastle University
- Location: Union building, Newcastle upon Tyne, United Kingdom
- Established: 1881 as the Junior Union Society
- Sabbatical officers: President: Ilsa Hartley; Academic Officer: Gina Tindale; Wellbeing & Communities Officer: Lily Allan; Opportunities Officer: James Geary; Sports Officer: Alex Duggan; Student Media Officer: Libby Griffiths
- Trustees: Ian Kitchen, David Miller, Adrian Alexander Drewett, Fridey Cordingley, Sarah Winship (external trustees); Rao Muhammad Karam, Ali Zuhad (student trustees)
- Affiliations: National Union of Students
- Website: Official website

Newcastle University Students' Union (NUSU) is the students' union of Newcastle University in Newcastle upon Tyne, England. It is an organisation with the intention of representing and providing services and welfare for the students of University of Newcastle upon Tyne. It was originally set up as the Union Society and changed to its present name in 2011. In 2022, its members voted to rejoin the National Union of Students (NUS). The Union voted to remain affiliated with the NUS in 2025.

The Students' Union is run by six sabbatical officers and nine voluntary unpaid liberation and chair positions. It also employs around 300 people in ancillary roles including bar staff and Freshers' Week organisers.

== Students' Union Building ==
The Students' Union Building

Unlike the majority of other students' unions in the United Kingdom, Newcastle University Students' Union owns the building where it is housed. The Union building was built in 1924 with a gift from an anonymous donor, who is believed to have been Sir Cecil Cochrane, a major benefactor to the university. It is built in the neo-Jacobean style and was designed by the local architect Robert Burns Dick whose firm designed the Laing Art Gallery, the towers of the Tyne Bridge and The Spanish City in Whitley Bay. It was opened on 22 October 1925 by the Rt. Hon. Lord Eustace Percy, who later served as Rector of King's College from 1937 to 1952. In 1987 the Students' Union was made a Grade II listed building.

The building was originally split in two with one union for men and one for women. In the 1960s the university funded a significant extension, known as the 'flying wing'. This was given to the union for a 99-year lease with a peppercorn rent. The modernist copper-clad extension, which is part of the Hadrian Building, was designed by Sir William Whitfield who also designed the Northern Stage. A debating chamber which hung over Kings Road was also built, though it was demolished in 2003.

In 2010 the university donated £8 million towards a redevelopment project for the Union Building. This work won the Education Interior Design category of the National Mixology Interior Design Awards 2011.

The building houses Luther's – the student union bar, the Student Advice Centre (SAC) and food outlets including Subway and Domino's, along with a number of offices and rooms for its members. In the basement is Venue, a nightclub and event space, with space for 1,400 people. Artists that have performed at Students' Union include Maxïmo Park, Snow Patrol, Coldplay, George Ezra and The 1975. The union building also houses a printers and a branch of Santander.

== History ==
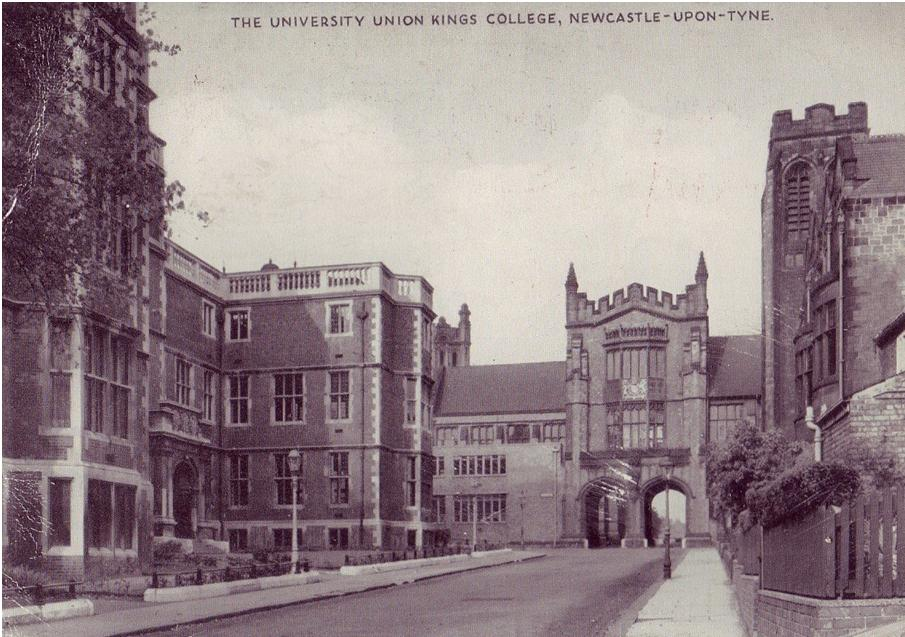
Union society building (left) in 1950

NUSU is made from a merger of several earlier student organisations. The oldest of these was the Junior Union Society, founded in 1881, which arranged debates and dances for the Durham colleges in Newcastle. From 1914 to 1925 Newcastle Union Society and the Durham Union Society collaborated with a shared president and vice-president selected alternatively from the two divisions. The previous Union Society dealt almost solely with student societies and entertainment and was governed by a Union Management Committee. The committee was composed of the President (in the Chair), the Lady President, two Vice Presidents (one male, one female), the Secretary, and various members of staff from King's College (including the Bursar and the Society Steward). This structure remained in varying forms until the 1950s.

The Students’ Representative Council (SRC) of Armstrong College was formed in 1900 to represent all students, in matters of policy, to the Board of Professors. It remained a separate entity from the Union Society. In 1937 it became the SRC of King's College, and subsequently for Newcastle University when it disaffiliated from Durham University in 1963. The management of the Union building was run by a board of trustees appointed by the University Council.

In 1985, the SRC was merged into the Union Society. This put the student council and its elected student representatives in full control of the union. In 1990 the union also went through significant restructuring after a period of poor management and high debts.

The Union Society became a limited company, with a board of trustees, in 2009. In 2011 it also became an independent charity after completing the legal requirements and registering with the Charity Commission. This coincided with a name change to Newcastle University Students’ Union (NUSU).

In 2017, the Students' Union voted to rename the student bar from Mensbar to Luther's, to commemorate the 50th anniversary of the honorary doctorate awarded to Martin Luther King Jr. by the university in 1967. The previous name came from the fact it was initially male-only, originally Men's bar, and from the motto - ‘Mens Agitat Molem’ – of the Armstrong College.

=== National Union of Students ===
As of March 2025, NUSU is an affiliated member of the NUS, with 71% of students voting to remain affiliated with the organisation.

In May 2016, NUSU held a referendum on their membership of the NUS. A 67% majority of students voted to end the affiliation. The then NUSU president Dominic Fearon said students felt the NUS “no longer represents their views, does not prioritise correctly, and is not effective at achieving change.” A second referendum was held in December 2018 with the result being to not re-affiliate with 52% of the vote, and a turnout of only 4%.

== Clubs and societies ==
Newcastle Students' Union has over 160 registered student societies in many different areas from the 20 Minute Society to Zumba. There are also 65 sports clubs run through the Athletic Union (AU). Students are able to set up their own societies. For a society to become ratified it must have 15 members as well as an executive committee which consists of a president, secretary and treasurer. Any student is eligible to become a member of a society and the typical membership fee is £5.

== Elected Officers ==
Newcastle University Students' Union is run by six full-time Sabbatical Officers, seven unpaid part-time Liberation Officers, and two unpaid part-time Chairs. The sabbatical officers work as full-time employees of the Students' Union whilst the part-time officers complete the role alongside their studies.

Officers are elected usually in March via a cross-campus vote typically preceded by a 50-hour campaign period. All Newcastle University students are eligible to vote in elections via the Student Union website. Officers officially begin their roles in July of the year in which they are elected. The election period typically sees candidates canvassing around campus and student accommodation sites as well as participate in debates facilitated by the Students' Union and in more recent years, The Courier, NSR and NUTV. The results of the elections are typically announced on the Friday of elections week often in a live-show format held within the Students' Union. Newcastle University Students' Union currently uses a transferable voting system which allows students to vote for candidates for each position in order of preference as well as vote to re-open nominations (RON) if the student does not feel any candidates are appropriate for the role.

== Student media ==
The Courier is a weekly free student newspaper. Established in 1948, the current weekly readership is around 12,000, most of whom are students at the university. It is published every Monday during term time. The Courier has won The Guardian's Student Newspaper of the Year award in 1994, 2012 and 2013. The Courier is edited by a number of section sub-editors who are all Newcastle University students. The Courier also has a head editor - the Student Media Officer - who works full-time editing the newspaper. The role is a sabbatical officer role and is therefore elected by Newcastle University students for a one-year term. The current editor is Lucy Bower.

Newcastle Student Radio (NSR) is a student radio station based in the university, which broadcasts 24 hours a day. It hosts music alongside news, sport and talk programs. The station aims to cater for a wide range of musical tastes, from Metal and Punk to R&B and swing music.

NUTV, known as TCTV from 2010–17, is a student television channel first established in 2007. NUTV's output is on-demand on its YouTube channel and through live broadcasts. It covers events such as student council and sports as well as student-made dramas, cookery programmes and fashion shows. It is affiliated with The National Student Television Association (NaSTA) and has links to the Royal Television Society.

== Notable former officers ==
- Henry Miller, secretary 1935–6 and president 1936–7
- Stuart Prebble, president 1972–3
- Dianne Nelmes, president 1973–4
- Brian Thomson, deputy president 1986–7
- Tim Farron, president 1991–2

== See also ==
- List of students' unions in the United Kingdom not affiliated with the NUS
- Durham Students' Union
