= Ewa Orłowska =

Polish logician (born 1935)

Stella Ewa Orłowska (born 1935) is a Polish logician. Her research centers on the concept that everything in logic and set theory can be expressed in terms of relations, and has used this idea to publish works on deduction systems and model theory for non-classical logic, and logics of non-deterministic and incomplete information. She is a professor at the National Institute of Telecommunications in Warsaw, and the former president of the Polish Association for Logic and Philosophy of Science.

== Education and career ==
Orłowska studied mathematics at the University of Warsaw, earning her master's degree in 1957 and a Ph.D. in 1971. The dissertation, Theorem Proving Systems, was supervised by Helena Rasiowa. She completed her habilitation there in 1978, with the habilitation thesis Resolution Systems and their Applications.

She was a researcher for the Polish Academy of Sciences from 1959 to 1966, and an assistant professor of mathematics at the University of Warsaw from 1971 to 1979. From 1980 to 1996 she returned to the Polish Academy of Sciences, with positions equivalent to associate and then full professor. She has been a professor at the National Institute of Telecommunications since 1996.

She chaired the editorial board of the journal Studia Logica from 1989 to 1991, and served as president of the Polish Association for Logic and Philosophy of Science from 1996 to 1999.

== Books ==
Orłowska is the author of books including:

- Systemy Herbranda dowodzenia twierdzeń rachunku predykatów [Herbrand systems for proving theorems of predicate calculus] (Państwowe Wydawnictwo Naukowe, 1976)
- Incomplete Information: Structure, Inference, Complexity (with S. Demri, Springer, 2002)
- Dual Tableaux: Foundation, Methodology, Case Studies (with Joanna Golińska-Pilarek, Springer, 2011)
- Dualities for Structures of Applied Logics (with Anna Maria Radzikowska and Ingrid Rewitzky, College Publications, 2015)

She has also edited many volumes of collected papers, including several volumes commemorating the works of Helena Rasiowa and Zdzisław Pawlak. The book Ewa Orłowska on Relational Methods in Logic and Computer Science, edited by Joanna Golińska-Pilarek and Michal Zawidski, was published by Springer in 2018 in their Outstanding Contributions to Logic book series.
