= Chris Day (hepatologist) =

British hepatologist (born 1960)

Christopher Day CBE DL

Vice Chancellor of Newcastle University
- Incumbent
- Assumed office January 2017
- Preceded by: Chris Brink

Personal details
- Born: February 1960 (age 66)
- Education: Churchill College, Cambridge (MBBS)

Christopher Paul Day CBE DL (born February 1960) is a British hepatologist who is Vice-Chancellor of Newcastle University.

== Career ==
Educated at Marden High School, Tynemouth Sixth Form College and Churchill College, Cambridge, Day became a clinician at the Freeman Hospital in Newcastle upon Tyne in 1985 and a research scientist in liver disease at Newcastle University in 1987. He went on to be Consultant Hepatologist on the Liver Unit at the Freeman Hospital in 1994 before becoming Professor of Liver Medicine at Newcastle University in 2000. He became head of the School of Clinical Medical Sciences at Newcastle University in 2004, Pro-Vice-Chancellor in 2007 and Vice-Chancellor in January 2017. He also became chair of the Russell Group of universities in September 2023.

Day was appointed Commander of the Order of the British Empire (CBE) in the 2023 New Year Honours for services to health research and treatment. He is also a Deputy Lieutenant of Tyne and Wear. In 2008, he was elected a Fellow of the Academy of Medical Sciences.

Academic offices
Preceded by Chris Brink	Vice-Chancellor of the University of Newcastle upon Tyne; 2017–	Succeeded by Incumbent
