= Monographiae Biologicae =

- Author: (Series Editors:) Dumont, Henri J., Werger, Marinus J.A.
- Genre: Academic literature
- Publisher: Kluwer Academic
- Published: 1957
- Media type: Print, E books
- No. of books: 80
- Preceded by: Physiologia comparata et oecologia

Monographiae Biologicae (ISSN 0077-0639) is a scholarly scientific literature review series, consisting of monographs published by Kluwer Academic Publishers, an imprint of Springer Science+Business Media. The series subject area generally covers ecology, zoology, and biology. More specifically, the book series covers the biogeography of continental areas, including whole continents; differentiated stand-alone ecosystems such as islands, island groups, mountains or mountain chains; aquatic or marine ecosystems such as coastal systems, mangroves, coral reefs, and other related ecosystems. Fresh water environments are also included in this series such as major river basins, lakes, and groups of lakes.

Taxonomic studies include the main groups of animals, plants, fungi and the comparative ecology of major biomes.

The series continues Physiologia comparata et oecologia, (ISSN 0369-8637).

== Abstracting and indexing ==
This series is indexed by the following services:

- Bibliography of agriculture (USDA)
- Biological Abstracts
- Chemical Abstracts Service
- GeoRef
