= Ingrid Rewitzky =

Ingrid Rewitzky is a South African mathematician and academic. She is a professor of mathematics at Stellenbosch University, where she has also served as Executive Head of the Department of Mathematical Sciences and Vice-Dean for Learning and Teaching in the Faculty of Science.

Rewitzky's research includes mathematical logic, program semantics and duality theory. She has also conducted research in undergraduate mathematics education, with a particular interest in the complexities of mathematical proficiency.

== Early life and education ==
Rewitzky obtained a Bachelor of Science degree with distinction from Rhodes University in 1988 and a Bachelor of Science Honours degree in Mathematics with distinction in 1989. She subsequently completed a Master of Science degree in Mathematics with distinction at the University of Cape Town in 1991 and a Doctor of Philosophy (PhD) in Mathematics in 1995.

Following her doctoral studies, Rewitzky held research positions at the University of Cape Town and the University of Oxford. She was a Junior Research Fellow in the Department of Mathematics and Applied Mathematics at the University of Cape Town from 1994 to 1995, a Visiting Research Fellow at the Mathematical Institute at Oxford in 1996, and a Research Officer in Oxford's Computing Laboratory in 1997.

== Career and research ==
Rewitzky joined the University of Cape Town as a lecturer in 1998 and was promoted to senior lecturer in 2003. She joined Stellenbosch University as an associate professor in 2005 and was promoted to professor of Mathematics in 2009.

At Stellenbosch University, Rewitzky became Executive Head of the Department of Mathematical Sciences in 2010 and Vice-Dean for Learning and Teaching in the Faculty of Science in 2011.

Her mathematical research includes publications on dualities for structures of applied logics and for the semantics of programs. Her work in these areas connects mathematical structures with questions arising in logic and computer science.

Rewitzky has also pursued research in mathematics education, particularly undergraduate mathematics education and the development of mathematical proficiency. Through a Stellenbosch University Teaching Fellowship held from 2017 to 2022, she explored the use of complexity theory to reconsider the process of learning mathematics.

As part of her academic leadership at Stellenbosch University, Rewitzky has been involved in initiatives aimed at improving teaching and learning in the Faculty of Science. These included the development of a Teaching and Learning Hub, a differentiated tutorial support programme and online mathematics content, as well as curriculum and module renewal.

== Professional and community service ==
Rewitzky has contributed to mathematics education and the professional mathematical community through teaching, academic leadership, conference participation and activities supporting women in mathematics.

She participated in the African mathematical community through the African Women Mathematics Workshop and has been involved in initiatives promoting the participation and advancement of women in the mathematical sciences.

Rewitzky has also contributed to discussions on women in mathematics, including the importance of professional networks and creating a sense of belonging for women mathematicians. She has advocated for broader engagement with issues affecting women's participation in mathematics.

In 2014, she was listed as a plenary speaker at a conference of the Association for Mathematics Education of South Africa (AMESA).

In 2025, Rewitzky supported the South African Mathematical Society's Women in Mathematics event hosted by the Stellenbosch University Mathematics Division. The South African Mathematical Society credited her and Professor Sibusiso Moyo with supporting the event and mentoring the next generation of women mathematicians.

Rewitzky has also undertaken professional editorial and reviewing activities in mathematics. Her professional activities have included work associated with mathematical publishing and reviewing, including service connected with Mathematical Reviews.

== Awards and honours ==
In 2018, Rewitzky received the Stellenbosch University Chancellor's Award for excellence in teaching and learning. The award recognised sustained excellence and was limited to the university's top achievers in learning and teaching, research and community interaction.

As Vice-Dean for Teaching and Learning, Rewitzky was recognised for facilitating and supporting a scholarly approach to teaching and learning in the Faculty of Science. The university specifically cited her work in establishing the Teaching and Learning Hub, developing differentiated tutorial support and promoting interactive mathematics content and curriculum renewal.
