= Newcastle University =

University in Newcastle upon Tyne, England (established 1834)

- Type: Public
- Established: 1834; 192 years ago (as The Newcastle-upon-Tyne School of Medicine and Surgery); 1963; 63 years ago (as the University of Newcastle upon Tyne)
- Academic affiliations: ACU; EUA; N8 Group; Russell Group; Universities UK; Defence Universities Alliance
- Endowment: £98.3 million (2025)
- Budget: £618.7 million (2024/25)
- Chancellor: Imtiaz Dharker
- Vice-Chancellor: Chris Day
- Academic staff: 2,935 (2024/25)
- Administrative staff: 3,525 (2024/25)
- Students: 27,230 (2024/25); 26,255 FTE (2024/25)
- Undergraduates: 21,245 (2024/25)
- Postgraduates: 5,985 (2024/25)
- Location: Tyne and Wear, England; 54.978°N 1.615°W
- Campus: Urban
- Colours: rich blue
- Mascot: Percy the Lion
- Website: ncl.ac.uk

The University of Newcastle upon Tyne, which trades as Newcastle University, is a public research university based in Newcastle upon Tyne, England. It has overseas campuses in Singapore and Malaysia. The university is a red brick university and a founding member of the Russell Group, an association of research-intensive UK universities.

The university's history began with the School of Medicine and Surgery (later the College of Medicine), established in Newcastle in 1834, and the College of Physical Science (later renamed Armstrong College), founded in 1871. These two colleges came to form the larger division of the federal University of Durham, with the Durham Colleges forming the other. The Newcastle colleges merged to form King's College in 1937. In 1963, following an act of Parliament, King's College became the University of Newcastle upon Tyne.

The university is subdivided into three faculties: the Faculty of Humanities and Social Sciences; the Faculty of Medical Sciences; and the Faculty of Science, Agriculture and Engineering. The university offers over 200 full-time undergraduate degree programmes and over 300 postgraduate taught and research programmes across a range of disciplines. The annual income of the institution for 2024–25 was £618.7 million of which £133.8 million was from research grants and contracts, with an expenditure of £621 million.

== History ==
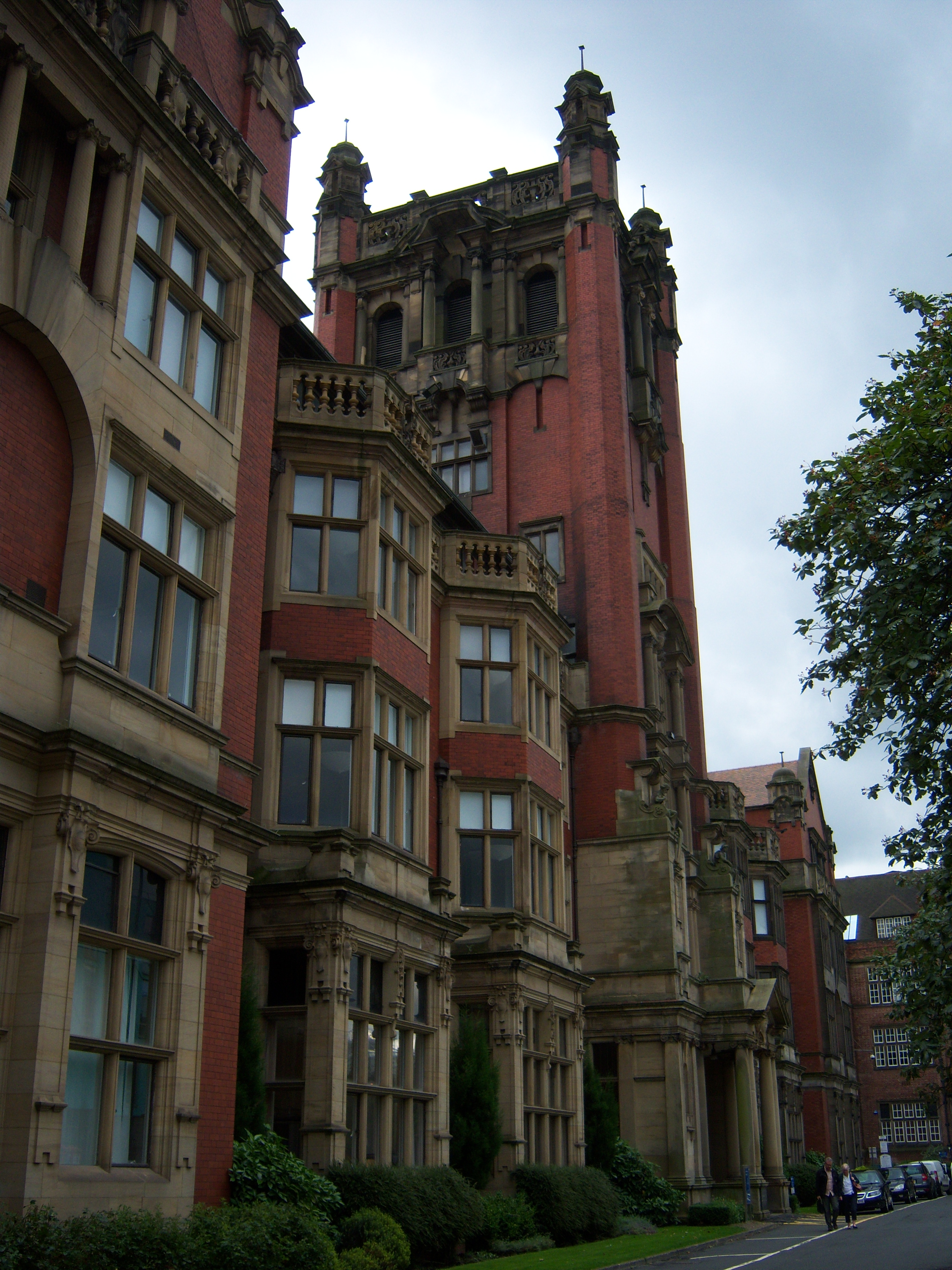
The Armstrong Building

The establishment of a university in Newcastle upon Tyne was first proposed in 1831 by Thomas Greenhow in a lecture to the Literary and Philosophical Society. In 1832 a group of local medics – physicians George Fife (teaching materia medica and therapeutics) and Samuel Knott (teaching theory and practice of medicine), and surgeons John Fife (teaching surgery), Alexander Fraser (teaching anatomy and physiology) and Henry Glassford Potter (teaching chemistry) – started offering medical lectures in Bell's Court to supplement the apprenticeship system (a fourth surgeon, Duncan McAllum, is mentioned by some sources among the founders, but was not included in the prospectus). The first session started on 1 October 1832 with eight or nine students, including John Snow, then apprenticed to a local surgeon-apothecary, the opening lecture being delivered by John Fife. In 1834 the lectures and practical demonstrations moved to the Hall of the Company of Barber Surgeons to accommodate the growing number of students, and the School of Medicine and Surgery was formally established on 1 October 1834.

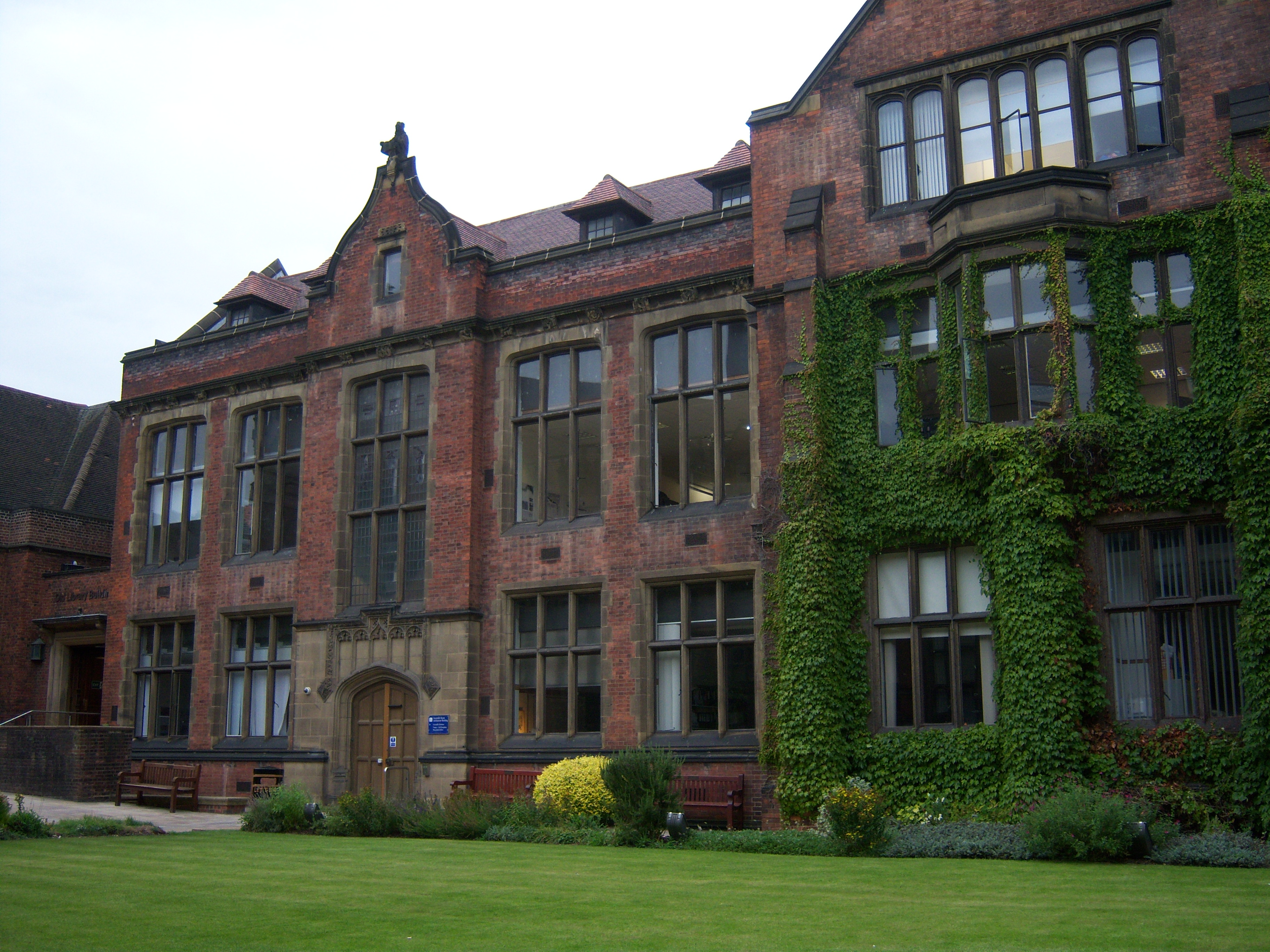
Architecture Building, Newcastle University

On 25 June 1851, following a dispute among the teaching staff, the school was formally dissolved and the lecturers split into two rival institutions. The majority formed the Newcastle College of Medicine, and the others established themselves as the Newcastle upon Tyne College of Medicine and Practical Science with competing lecture courses. In July 1851 the majority college was recognised by the Society of Apothecaries and in October by the Royal College of Surgeons of England and in January 1852 was approved by the University of London to submit its students for London medical degree examinations. Later in 1852, the majority college was formally linked to the University of Durham, becoming the "Newcastle-upon-Tyne College of Medicine in connection with the University of Durham". The college awarded its first 'Licence in Medicine' (LicMed) under the auspices of the University of Durham in 1856, with external examiners from Oxford and London, becoming the first medical examining body in the United Kingdom to institute practical examinations alongside written and viva voce examinations. The two colleges amalgamated in 1857, with the first session of the unified college opening on 3 October that year. In 1861 the degree of Master of Surgery was introduced, allowing for the double qualification of Licence of Medicine and Bachelor of Surgery, along with the degrees of Bachelor of Medicine and Doctor of Medicine, both of which required residence in Durham. In 1870 the college was brought into closer connection with the university, becoming the "Durham University College of Medicine" with the Reader in Medicine becoming the Professor of Medicine, the college gaining a representative on the university's senate, and residence at the college henceforth counting as residence in the university towards degrees in medicine and surgery, removing the need for students to spend a period of residence in Durham before they could receive the higher degrees.

Attempts to realise a place for the teaching of sciences in the city were finally met with the foundation of the College of Physical Science in 1871. The college offered instruction in mathematics, physics, chemistry and geology to meet the growing needs of the mining industry, becoming the "Durham College of Physical Science" in 1883 and then renamed after William George Armstrong as Armstrong College in 1904. Both of these institutions were part of the University of Durham, which became a federal university under the University of Durham Act 1908 (8 Edw. 7. c. 20) with two divisions in Durham and Newcastle. By 1908, the Newcastle division was teaching a full range of subjects in the Faculties of Medicine, Arts, and Science, which also included agriculture and engineering.

Universities of Durham and Newcastle upon Tyne Act 1963
- Act of Parliament
- Parliament of the United Kingdom
- Long title: An Act to dissolve the council of the Durham Colleges in the University of Durham and to transfer the property and liabilities of that council to the University of Durham, to enact further provisions with regards to the University of Durham, to incorporate the University of Newcastle upon Tyne, to dissolve the council of King's College Newcastle upon Tyne in the University of Durham and to transfer the property and liabilities of that council to the University of Newcastle upon Tyne, to enact provisions with regard to the University of Newcastle upon Tyne; and for other purposes.
- Citation: 1963 c. xi

Dates
- Royal assent: 10 July 1963

Text of statute as originally enacted

Throughout the early 20th century, the medical and science colleges outpaced the growth of their Durham counterparts. Following tensions between the two Newcastle colleges in the early 1930s, a royal commission in 1934 recommended the merger of the two colleges to form "King's College, Durham"; that was effected by the University of Durham Act 1935 (25 & 26 Geo. 5. c. 29). Further growth of both division of the federal university led to tensions within the structure and a feeling that it was too large to manage as a single body. On 1 August 1963 the Universities of Durham and Newcastle upon Tyne Act 1963 (c. xi) separated the two thus creating the "University of Newcastle upon Tyne". As the successor of King's College, Durham, the university at its founding in 1963, adopted the coat of arms originally granted to the Council of King's College in 1937.

Above the portico of the Students' Union building are bas-relief carvings of the arms and mottoes of the University of Durham, Armstrong College and Durham University College of Medicine, the predecessor parts of Newcastle University. While a Latin motto, mens agitat molem (mind moves matter) appears in the Students' Union building, the university itself does not have an official motto.

In 1967, Newcastle became the only British university to confer an honorary degree on Martin Luther King.

The university established a branch campus in London in 2015, in partnership with INTO University Partnerships, at INTO's existing London campus. The London campus was closed in 2021.

In 2024, Newcastle University had a drop in income of £35 million, referred to as a crisis by the local branch of the Universities and Colleges Union (UCU). The university had already made £15 million of savings in its budget for the year, but this left a deficit of £20 million. As a result, academic promotions were cancelled and the university announced a voluntary redundancy scheme. The UCU held a consultative ballot of members on possible strike action related to the cuts in November 2024.

== Campus and location ==
=== United Kingdom ===
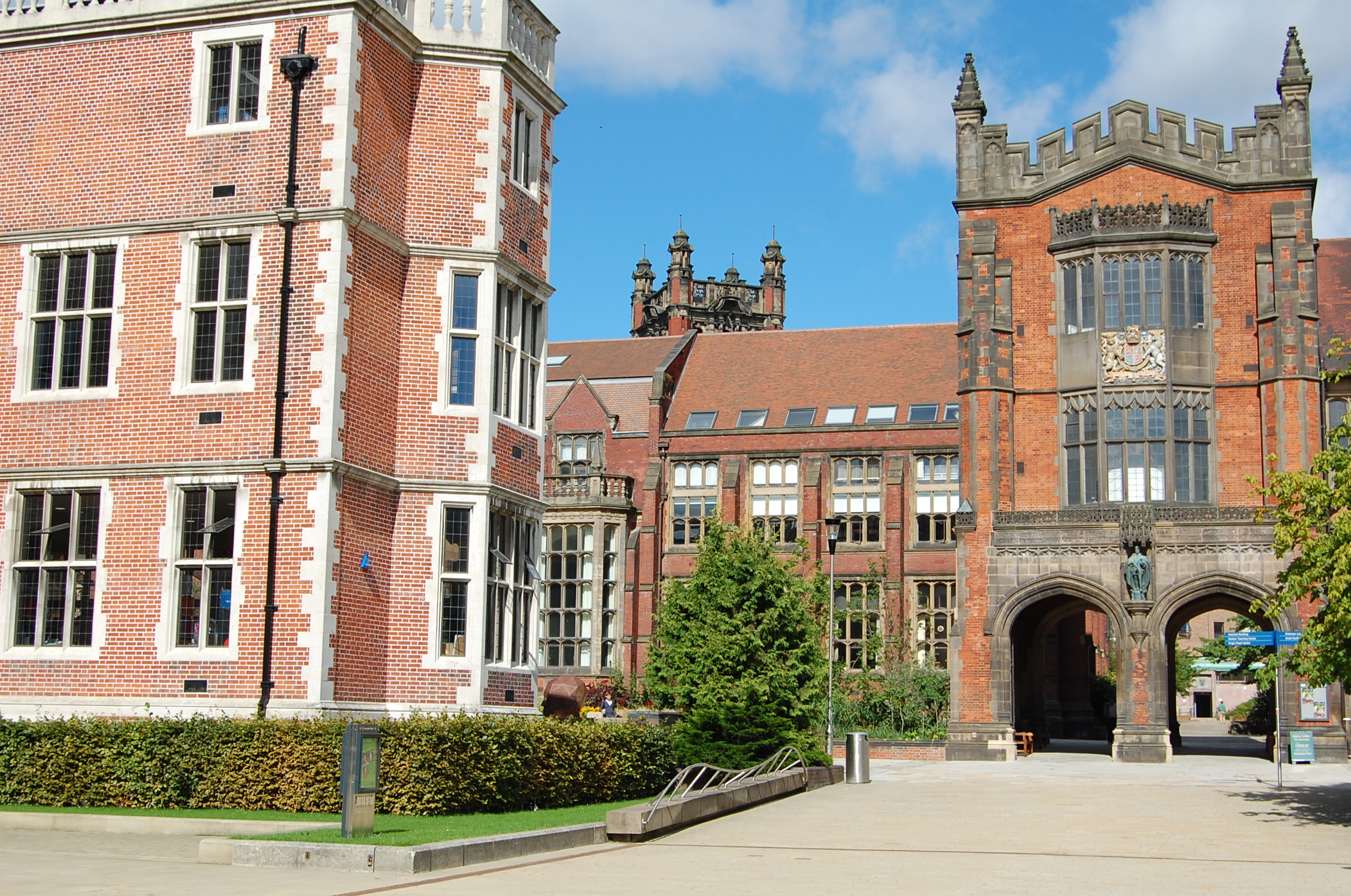
Newcastle University campus, looking towards the Arches with the Students' Union building on the left (2013)

Newcastle University on OpenStreetMap

The university occupies a campus site close to Haymarket in central Newcastle upon Tyne. It is located to the northwest of the city centre between the open spaces of Leazes Park and the Town Moor; the university medical school and Royal Victoria Infirmary are adjacent to the west.

The Armstrong building is the oldest building on the campus and is the site of the original Armstrong College. The building was constructed in three stages; the north east wing was completed first at a cost of £18,000 and opened by Princess Louise on 5 November 1888. The south-east wing, which includes the Jubilee Tower, and south-west wings were opened in 1894. The Jubilee Tower was built with surplus funds raised from an Exhibition to mark Queen Victoria's Jubilee in 1887. The north-west front, forming the main entrance, was completed in 1906 and features two stone figures to represent science and the arts. Much of the later construction work was financed by Sir Isaac Lowthian Bell, the metallurgist and former Lord Mayor of Newcastle, after whom the main tower is named. In 1906 it was opened by King Edward VII.

The building contains the King's Hall, which serves as the university's chief hall for ceremonial purposes where Congregation ceremonies are held. It can contain 500 seats. King Edward VII gave permission to call the Great Hall, King's Hall. During the First World War, the building was requisitioned by the War Office to create the first Northern General Hospital, a facility for the Royal Army Medical Corps to treat military casualties. Graduation photographs are often taken in the University Quadrangle, next to the Armstrong building. In 1949 the Quadrangle was turned into a formal garden in memory of members of Newcastle University who gave their lives in the two World Wars. In 2017, a statue of Martin Luther King Jr. was erected in the inner courtyard of the Armstrong Building, to celebrate the 50th anniversary of his honorary degree from the university.

The Bruce Building is a former brewery, constructed between 1896 and 1900 on the site of the Hotspur Hotel, and designed by the architect Joseph Oswald as the new premises of Newcastle Breweries Limited. The university occupied the building from the 1950s, but, having been empty for some time, the building was refurbished in 2016 to become residential and office space.

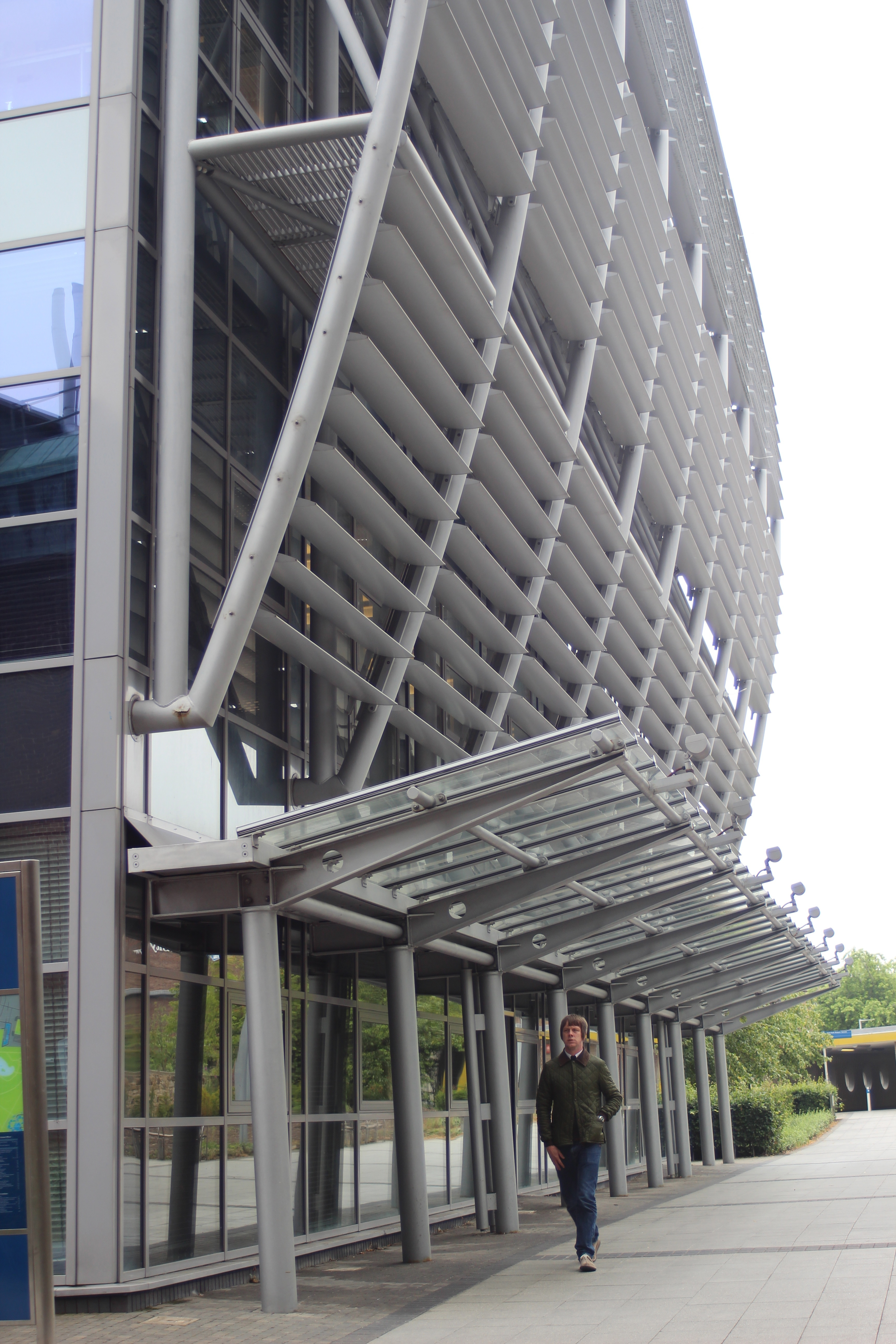
The Devonshire Building

The Devonshire Building, opened in 2004, incorporates in an energy efficient design. It uses photovoltaic cells to help to power motorised shades that control the temperature of the building and geothermal heating coils. Its architects won awards in the Hadrian awards and the RICS Building of the Year Award 2004. The university won a Green Gown Award for its construction.

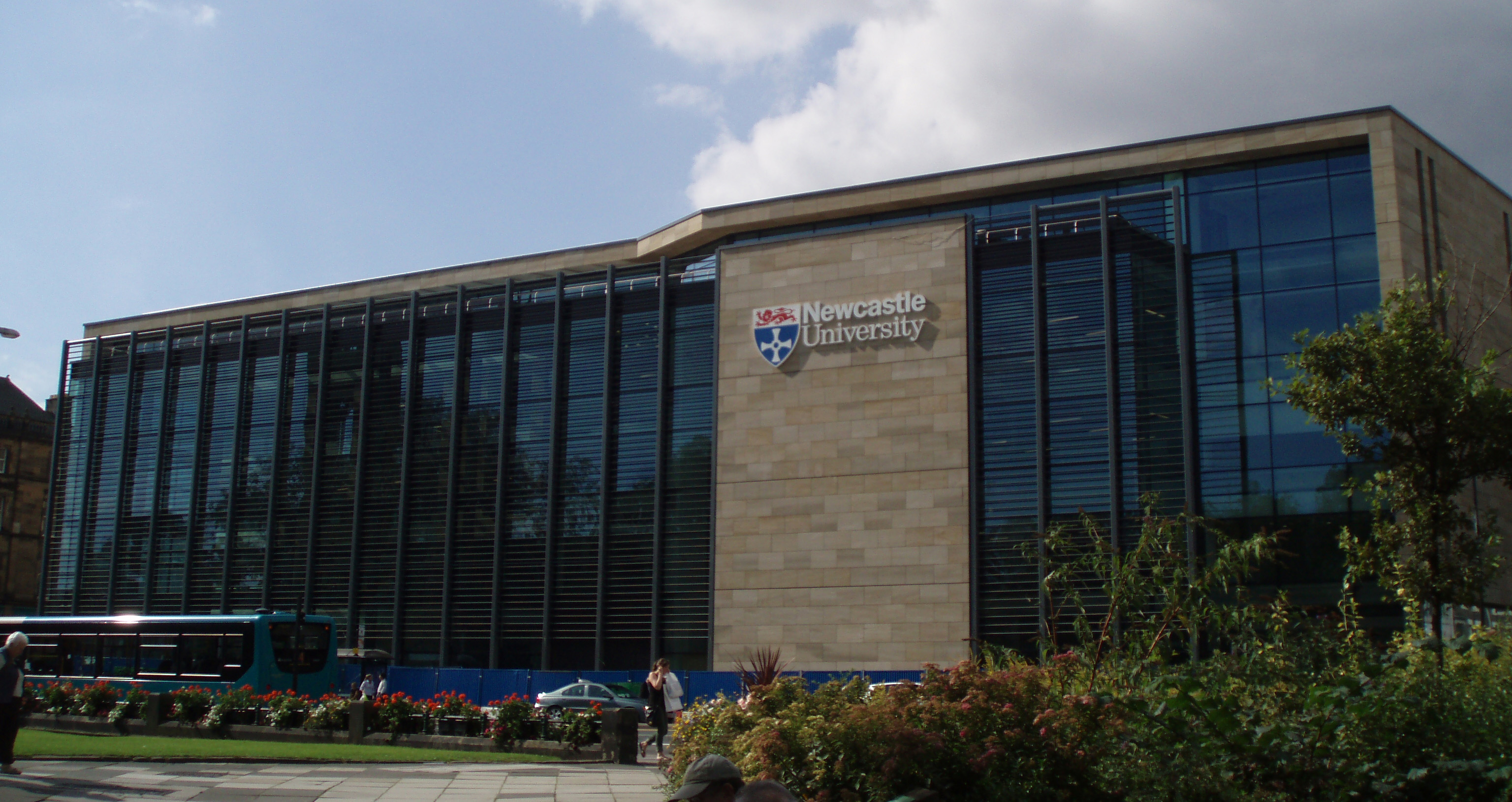
The King's Gate building hosts student and administrative services and was built in 2009.

Plans for additions and improvements to the campus were made public in March 2008 and completed in 2010 at a cost of £200 million. They included a redevelopment of the south-east (Haymarket) façade with a five-storey King's Gate administration building as well as new student accommodation. Two additional buildings for the school of medicine were also built. September 2012 saw the completion of the new buildings and facilities for INTO Newcastle University on the university campus. The main building provides 18 new teaching rooms, a Learning Resource Centre, a lecture theatre, science lab, administrative and academic offices and restaurant.

The Philip Robinson Library is the main university library and is named after a bookseller in the city and benefactor to the library. The Walton Library specialises in services for the Faculty of Medical Sciences in the Medical School. It is named after Lord Walton of Detchant, former Dean of the Faculty of Medicine and Professor of Neurology. The library has a relationship with the Northern region of the NHS allowing their staff to use the library for research and study. The Law Library specialises in resources relating to law, and the Marjorie Robinson Library Rooms offers additional study spaces and computers. Together, these house over one million books and 500,000 electronic resources. Some schools within the university, such as the School of Modern Languages, also have their own smaller libraries with smaller highly specialised collections.

In addition to the city centre campus there are buildings such as the Dove Marine Laboratory located on Cullercoats Bay, and Cockle Park Farm in Northumberland.

=== International ===
In September 2008, the university's first overseas branch was opened in Singapore, a Marine International campus called, NUMI Singapore. This later expanded beyond marine subjects and became Newcastle University Singapore, largely through becoming an Overseas University Partner of Singapore Institute of Technology.

In 2011, the university's Medical School opened an international branch campus in Iskandar Puteri, Johor, Malaysia, Newcastle University Medicine Malaysia.

=== Student accommodation ===
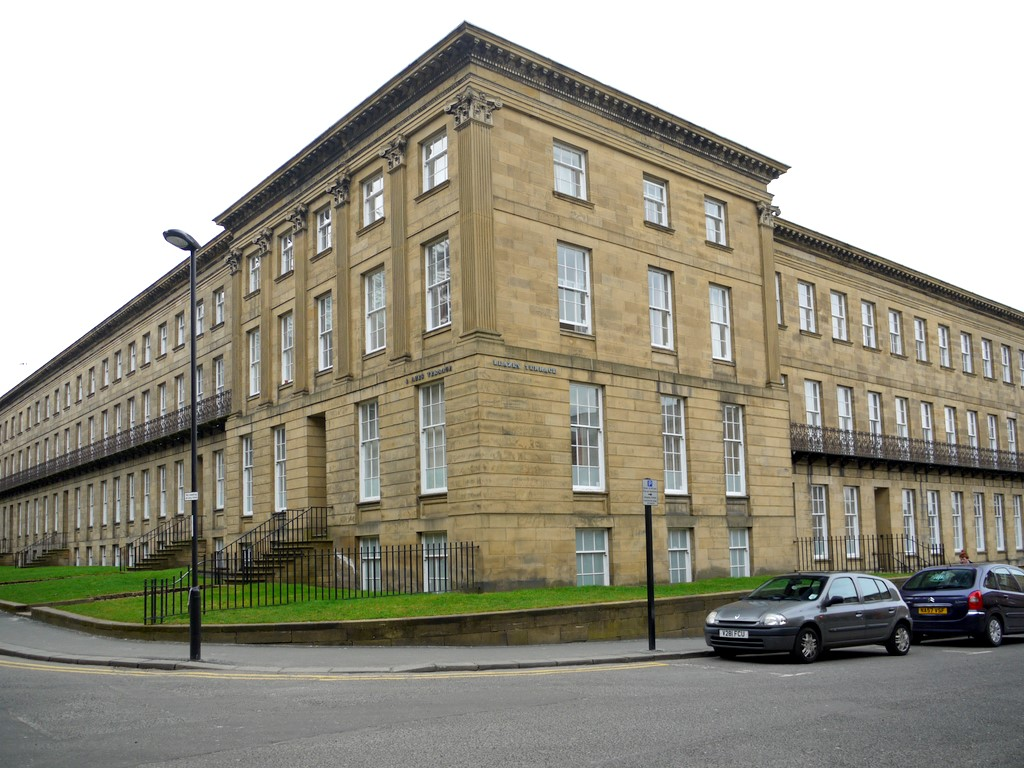
Leazes Terrace, a Grade I listed building, designed by Thomas Oliver and built by Richard Grainger, in 1829–34; now student accommodation.

Newcastle University has many catered and non-catered halls of residence available to first-year students, located around the city of Newcastle. Popular Newcastle areas for private student houses and flats off campus include Jesmond, Heaton, Sandyford, Shieldfield, South Shields and Spital Tongues.

Henderson Hall was used as a hall of residence but "had been empty for a few years" before a fire destroyed it in 2023.

St Mary's College in Fenham, one of the halls of residence, was formerly St Mary's College of Education, a teacher training college.

== Organisation and governance ==
The current chancellor is the British poet and artist Imtiaz Dharker. She assumed the position of chancellor on 1 January 2020. The vice-chancellor is Chris Day, a hepatologist and former pro-vice-chancellor of the faculty of medical sciences.

The university has an enrolment of some 16,000 undergraduate and 5,600 postgraduate students. Teaching and research are delivered in 19 academic schools, 13 research institutes and 38 research centres, spread across three faculties: the faculty of humanities and social sciences; the faculty of medical sciences; and the faculty of science, agriculture and engineering. The university offers around 175 full-time undergraduate degree programmes in a wide range of subject areas spanning arts, sciences, engineering and medicine, together with approximately 340 postgraduate taught and research programmes across a range of disciplines.

It holds a series of public lectures called 'Insights' each year in the Curtis Auditorium in the Herschel Building. Many of the university's partnerships with companies, like Red Hat, are housed in the Herschel Annex.

=== Chancellors and vice-chancellors ===
==== Chancellors ====
- Hugh Percy, 10th Duke of Northumberland (1963–1988)
- Matthew White Ridley, 4th Viscount Ridley (1988–1999)
- Chris Patten (1999–2009)
- Liam Donaldson (2009–2019)
- Imtiaz Dharker (2020–)

==== Vice-chancellors ====
- Charles Bosanquet (1963–1968)
- Henry Miller (1968–1976)
- Ewan Stafford Page (1976–1978, acting)
- Laurence Martin (1978–1990)
- Duncan Murchison (1991, acting)
- James Wright (1992–2000)
- Christopher Edwards (2001–2007)
- Chris Brink (2007–2016)
- Chris Day (2017–present)

=== Civic responsibility ===
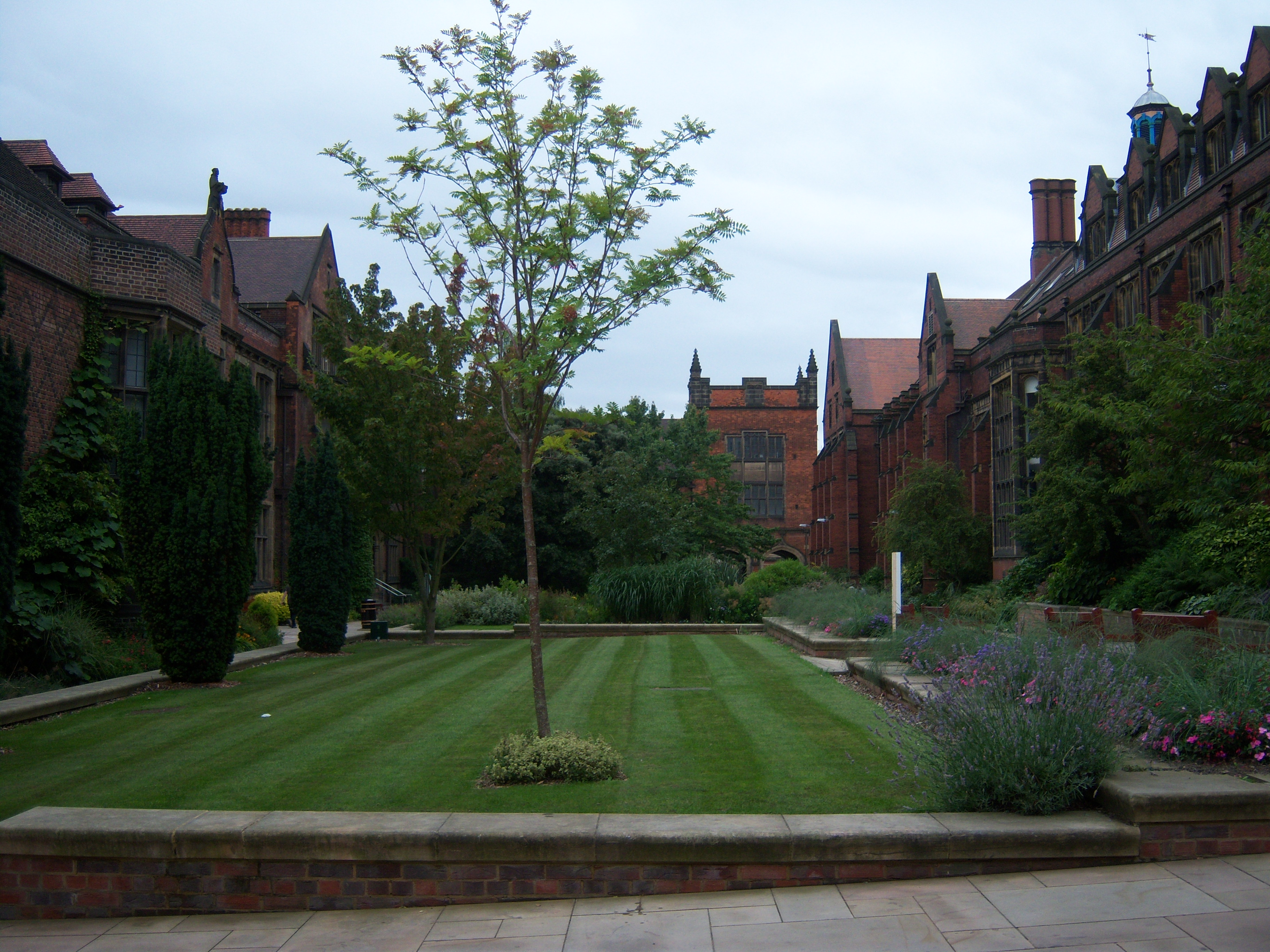
The university Quadrangle

The university describes itself as a civic university, with a role to play in society by bringing its research to bear on issues faced by communities (local, national or international).

In 2012, the university opened the Newcastle Institute for Social Renewal to address issues of social and economic change, representing the research-led academic schools across the Faculty of Humanities and Social Sciences and the Business School.

Mark Shucksmith was Director of the Newcastle Institute for Social Renewal (NISR) at Newcastle University, where he is also Professor of Planning.

In 2006, the university was granted fair trade status and from January 2007 it became a smoke-free campus.

The university has also been actively involved with several of the region's museums for many years. The Great North Museum: Hancock originally opened in 1884 and is often a venue for the university's events programme.

=== Faculties, schools and institutes ===
Teaching schools within the university are based within three faculties. Each faculty is led by a Provost/Pro-vice-chancellor and a team of Deans with specific responsibilities. The university also has research institutes based within each faculty.

==== Faculty of Humanities and Social Sciences ====
===== Schools =====
- School of Architecture, Planning and Landscape
- School of Arts and Cultures
- Newcastle University Business School (including the former Faculty of Economics and Social Sciences)
- School of Education, Communication and Language Sciences
- School of English Literature, Language and Linguistics
- School of Geography, Politics and Sociology
- School of History, Classics and Archaeology
- Newcastle Law School
- School of Modern Languages
- School X

===== Institutes =====
- Institute of Creative Arts Practice
- Humanities Research Institute
- Institute of Social Science

==== Faculty of Medical Sciences ====
===== Schools =====
- School of Biomedical, Nutritional and Sport Sciences
- School of Dental Sciences
- School of Medical Education
- School of Pharmacy
- School of Psychology
- Centre for Bacterial Cell Biology (CBCB)

===== Institutes =====
- Biosciences Institute
- Population Health Sciences Institute
- Translational and Clinical Research Institute

==== Faculty of Science, Agriculture and Engineering ====
===== Schools =====
- School of Computing
- School of Engineering
- School of Mathematics, Statistics and Physics
- School of Natural and Environmental Sciences

===== Institutes =====
- Agri-Food Research and Innovation
- Digital Institute

==== Economics Department ====
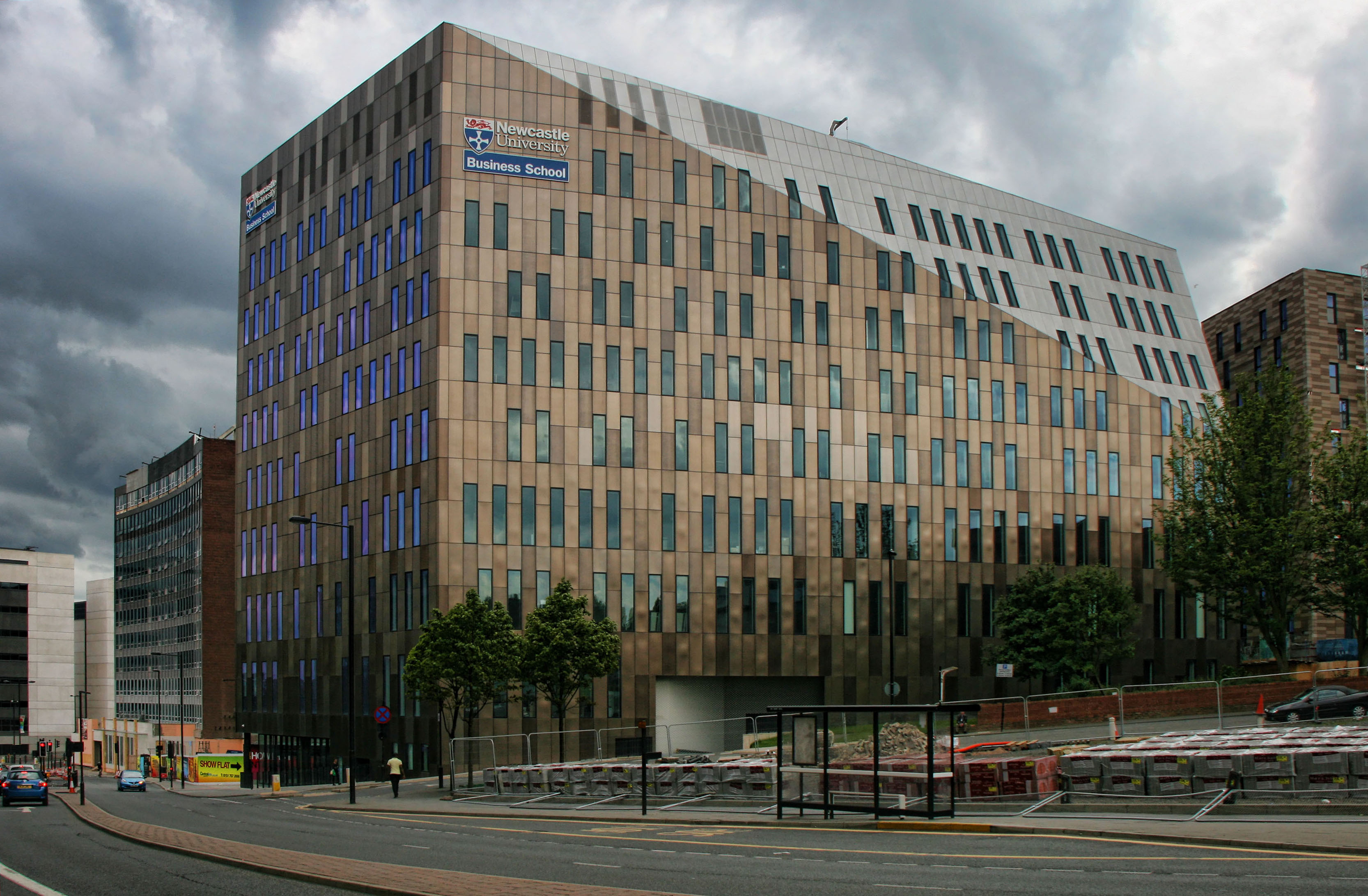
Newcastle University Business School

As early as the 1900/1 academic year, there was teaching in economics (political economy, as it was then known) at Newcastle, making Economics the oldest department in what would only much later become the Business School. The Economics Department is currently headed by the Sir David Dale Chair. Among the eminent economists having served in the Department (both as holders of the Sir David Dale Chair) are Harry Mainwaring Hallsworth and Stanley Dennison.

==== Business School ====
Like its peers in the north of England, such as the business schools of University of Bradford and Manchester Metropolitan University, Newcastle University Business School is a triple accredited business school, with accreditation by the three major accreditation bodies: AACSB, AMBA and EQUIS.

In 2002, Newcastle University Business School established the Business Accounting and Finance or 'Flying Start' degree in association with the ICAEW and PricewaterhouseCoopers. The course offers an accelerated route towards the ACA Chartered Accountancy qualification and is the Business School's Flagship programme.

In 2011 the business school opened their new building built on the former Scottish and Newcastle brewery site next to St James' Park. This building was officially opened on 19 March 2012 by Lord Burns.

The business school operated a central London campus from 2014 to 2021, in partnership with INTO University Partnerships until 2020.

==== Medical School ====
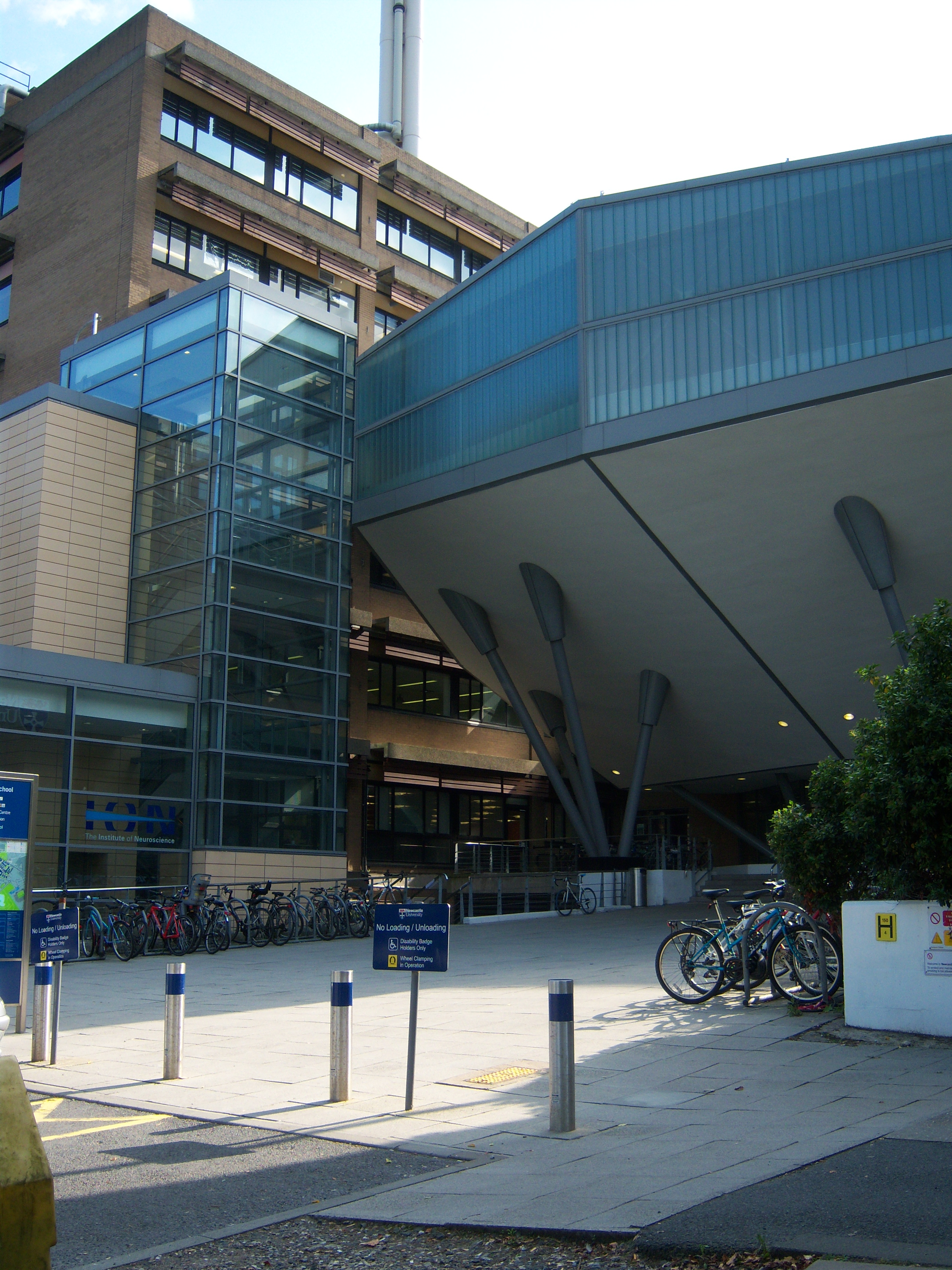
Medical faculty, Newcastle University

The BMC Medicine journal reported in 2008 that medical graduates from Oxford, Cambridge and Newcastle performed better in postgraduate tests than any other medical school in the UK.

In 2008 the Medical School announced that they were expanding their campus to Malaysia, which opened in 2011. The Medical Training (Prioritisation) Act 2026 excluded Newcastle University Medicine Malaysia graduates from priority access to the UK Foundation Programme that provides post-qualification training leading to registration as a doctor in the UK. The act prioritises medical graduates who trained in the UK, making it harder for graduates from Malaysia to gain places and thus access medical careers in Britain.

The Royal Victoria Infirmary has always had close links with the Faculty of Medical Sciences as a major teaching hospital.

==== School of Modern Languages ====
The School of Modern Languages consists of five sections: East Asian (which includes Japanese and Chinese); French; German; Spanish, Portuguese & Latin American Studies; and Translating & Interpreting Studies. Six languages are taught from beginner's level to full degree level ‒ Chinese, Japanese, French, German, Spanish and Portuguese ‒ and beginner's courses in Catalan, Dutch, Italian and Quechua are also available. Beyond the learning of the languages themselves, Newcastle also places a great deal of emphasis on study and experience of the cultures of the countries where the languages taught are spoken. The School of Modern Languages hosts North East England's only branches of two internationally important institutes: the Camões Institute, a language institute for Portuguese, and the Confucius Institute, a language and cultural institute for Chinese.

The teaching of modern foreign languages at Newcastle predates the creation of Newcastle University itself, as in 1911 Armstrong College in Newcastle installed Albert George Latham, its first professor of modern languages.

The School of Modern Languages at Newcastle is the lead institution in the North East Routes into Languages Consortium and, together with the Durham University, Northumbria University, the University of Sunderland, the Teesside University and a network of schools, undertakes work activities of discovery of languages for the 9 to 13 years pupils. This implies having festivals, Q&A sessions, language tasters, or quizzes organised, as well as a web learning work aiming at constructing a web portal to link language learners across the region.

==== Newcastle Law School ====
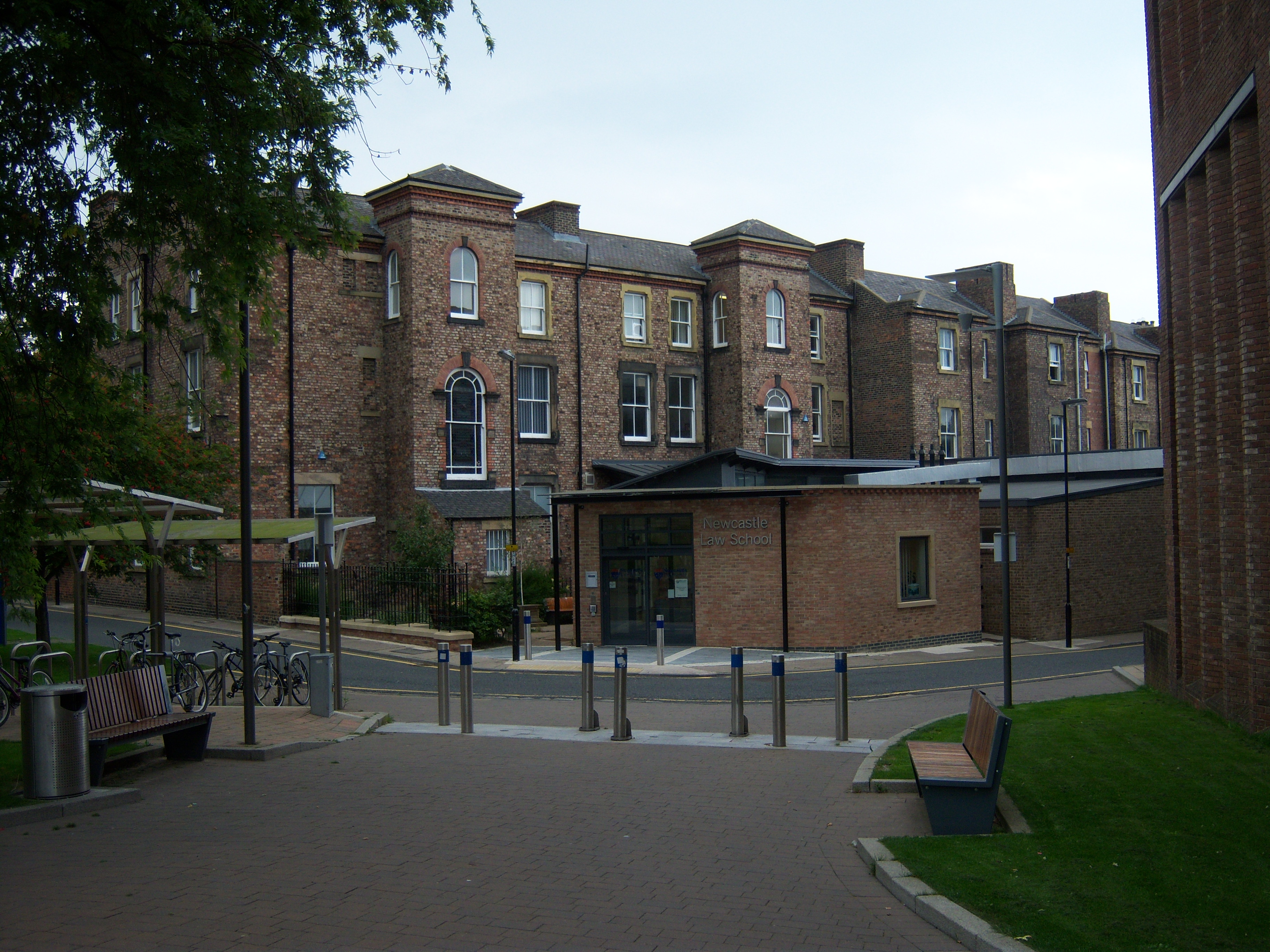
Newcastle Law School

Newcastle Law School is the longest established law school in the north-east of England when law was taught at the university's predecessor college before it became independent from Durham University. It has a number of recognised international and national experts in a variety of areas of legal scholarship ranging from Common and Chancery law, to International and European law, as well as contextual, socio-legal and theoretical legal studies.

The Law School occupies four specially adapted late-Victorian town houses. The Staff Offices, the Alumni Lecture Theatre and seminar rooms as well as the Law Library are all located within the School buildings.

==== School of Computing ====
The School of Computing was ranked in the Times Higher Education world Top 100. Research areas include Human-Computer Interaction (HCI) and ubiquitous computing, secure and resilient systems, synthetic biology, scalable computing (high performance systems, data science, machine learning and data visualization), and advanced modelling. The school led the formation of the National Innovation Centre for Data. Innovative teaching in the School was recognised in 2017 with the award of a National Teaching Fellowship.

=== Cavitation tunnel ===
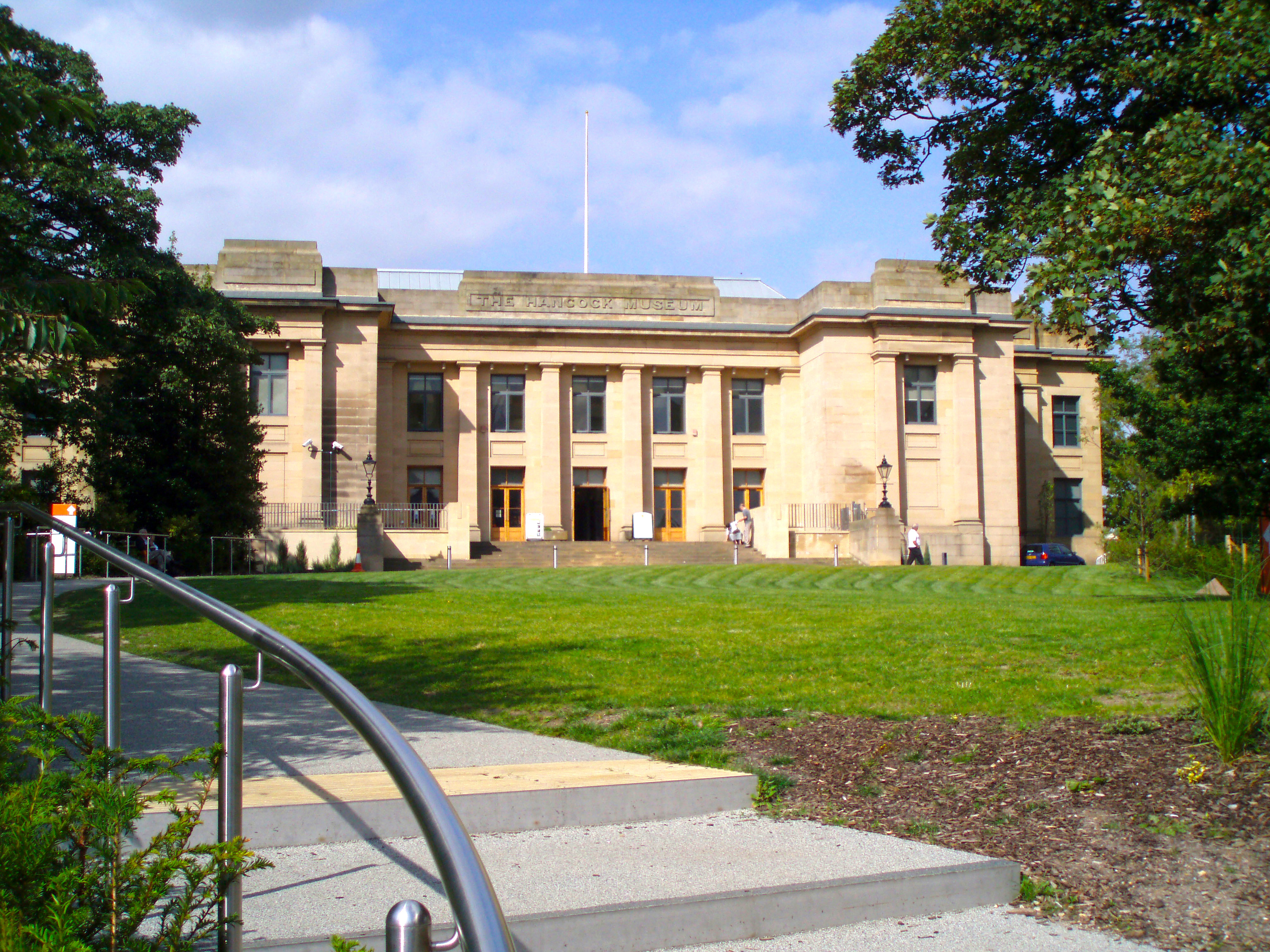
The Hancock Museum, founded in 1884, is the main location of the Great North Museum.

Newcastle University has the second largest cavitation tunnel in the UK. Founded in 1950, and based in the Marine Science and Technology Department, the Emerson Cavitation Tunnel is used as a test basin for propellers, water turbines, underwater coatings and interaction of propellers with ice. The Emerson Cavitation Tunnel was recently relocated to a new facility in Blyth.

=== Museums and galleries ===
The university is associated with a number of the region's museums and galleries, including the Great North Museum project, which is primarily based at the world-renowned Hancock Museum. The Great North Museum: Hancock also contains the collections from two of the university's former museums, the Shefton Museum and the Museum of Antiquities, both now closed. The university's Hatton Gallery is also a part of the Great North Museum project, and remains within the Fine Art Building.

=== Finances ===
In the financial year ending 31 July 2024, Newcastle had a total income of £619.8 million (2022/23 – £592.4 million) and total expenditure of £475 million (2022/23 – £558 million). Key sources of income included £307.4 million from tuition fees and education contracts (2022/23 – £286.2 million), £88.7 million from funding body grants (2022/23 – £88.9 million), £126.1 million from research grants and contracts (2022/23 – £119.3 million), £9.8 million from investment income (2022/23 – £6 million) and £7.6 million from donations and endowments (2022/23 – £11 million).

At year end, Newcastle had endowments of £94.8 million (2023 – £87.1 million) and total net assets of £627.2 million (2023 – £474.9 million). It holds the sixteenth-largest endowment of any university in the UK.

Due to a decline in the intake of international students as of 2025, the university is undergoing 300 full-time job cuts to recover from a £35 million shortfall. Since 20 January 2025, the university heads have proposed a "voluntary severance scheme" to allow staff to voluntarily leave their jobs, but they will not rule out forced job losses if the scheme does not reach their goal. Staff voted to take part in industrial strike action to oppose the cuts.

== Academic profile ==
=== Reputation and rankings ===
Rankings
National rankings
- Complete (2027): 35
- Guardian (2027): 82
- Times / Sunday Times (2027): 30

Global rankings
- ARWU (2026): 201–300
- QS (2027): 149
- THE (2026): 144

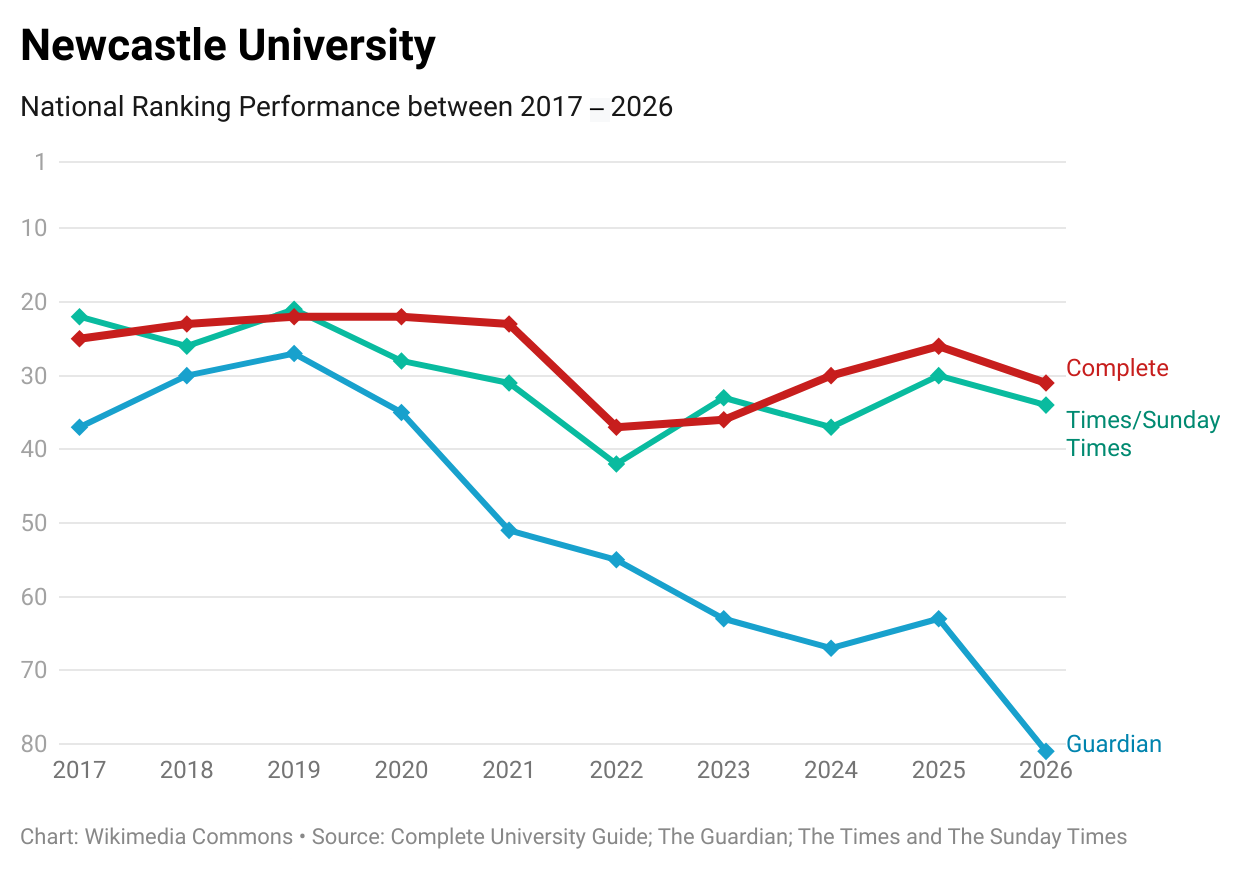
Newcastle University's national league table performance over the past ten years

The university is a member of the Russell Group of the UK's research-intensive universities. It is ranked in the top 200 of most world rankings, and in the top 40 of most UK rankings. As of 2023, it is ranked 110th globally by QS, 292nd by Leiden, 139th by Times Higher Education and 201st–300th by the Academic Ranking of World Universities. Nationally, it is ranked joint 33rd by the Times/Sunday Times Good University Guide, 30th by the Complete University Guide and joint 63rd by the Guardian.

=== Admissions ===
UCAS Admission Statistics
	2025	2024	2023	2022	2021
Applications (Note: Main scheme applications, International and UK)	37,575	36,825	35,980	33,735	32,400
Accepted	6,780	6,705	6,290	6,755	6,255
Applications/Accepted Ratio	5.5	5.5	5.7	5.0	5.2
Overall Offer Rate (%)	77.6	78.2	77.2	76.6	77.1
↳ UK only (%) (Note: UK domiciled applicants)	78.2	79.3	78.3	77.3	77.5
Average Entry Tariff	—N/a	—N/a	140	151	151
↳ Top three exams (Note: The maximum tariff score for three exams is 168: the equivalent of A*A*A* at A-Level, 777 at HL for the IB Diploma Programme, or AAA at Advanced Higher)	—N/a	—N/a	137.8	142.9	143.0

HESA Student Body Composition (2024/25)
Domicile and Ethnicity	Total
British White (Note: Not be confused solely with White British)	63%
British Ethnic Minorities (Note: Includes those who indicate that they identify as Asian, Black, Mixed Heritage, Arab or any other ethnicity except White.)	15%
International EU	2%
International Non-EU	21%
Undergraduate Widening Participation Indicators
Female	53%
Independent School	24%
Low Participation Areas (Note: Calculated from the Polar4 measure, using Quintile1, in England and Wales. Calculated from the Scottish Index of Multiple Deprivation (SIMD) measure, using SIMD20, in Scotland.)	9%

In the 2024/25 academic year, the student body consisted of 27,230 students, composed of 21,245 undergraduates and 5,985 postgraduate students. The university is consistently designated as a 'high-tariff' institution by the Department for Education, with the average undergraduate entrant to the university in recent years amassing between 137–143 UCAS Tariff points in their top three pre-university qualifications – the equivalent of AAB to AAA at A-Level. Based on 2022/23 HESA entry standards data published in domestic league tables, which include a broad range of qualifications beyond the top three exam grades, the average student at Newcastle University achieved 151 points. In 2015, the university gave offers of admission to 92.1% of its applicants, the highest amongst the Russell Group.

25.1% of Newcastle's undergraduates are privately educated, the thirteenth highest proportion amongst mainstream British universities. In the 2016–17 academic year, the university had a domicile breakdown of 74:5:21 of UK:EU:non-EU students respectively with a female to male ratio of 51:49.

=== Research ===
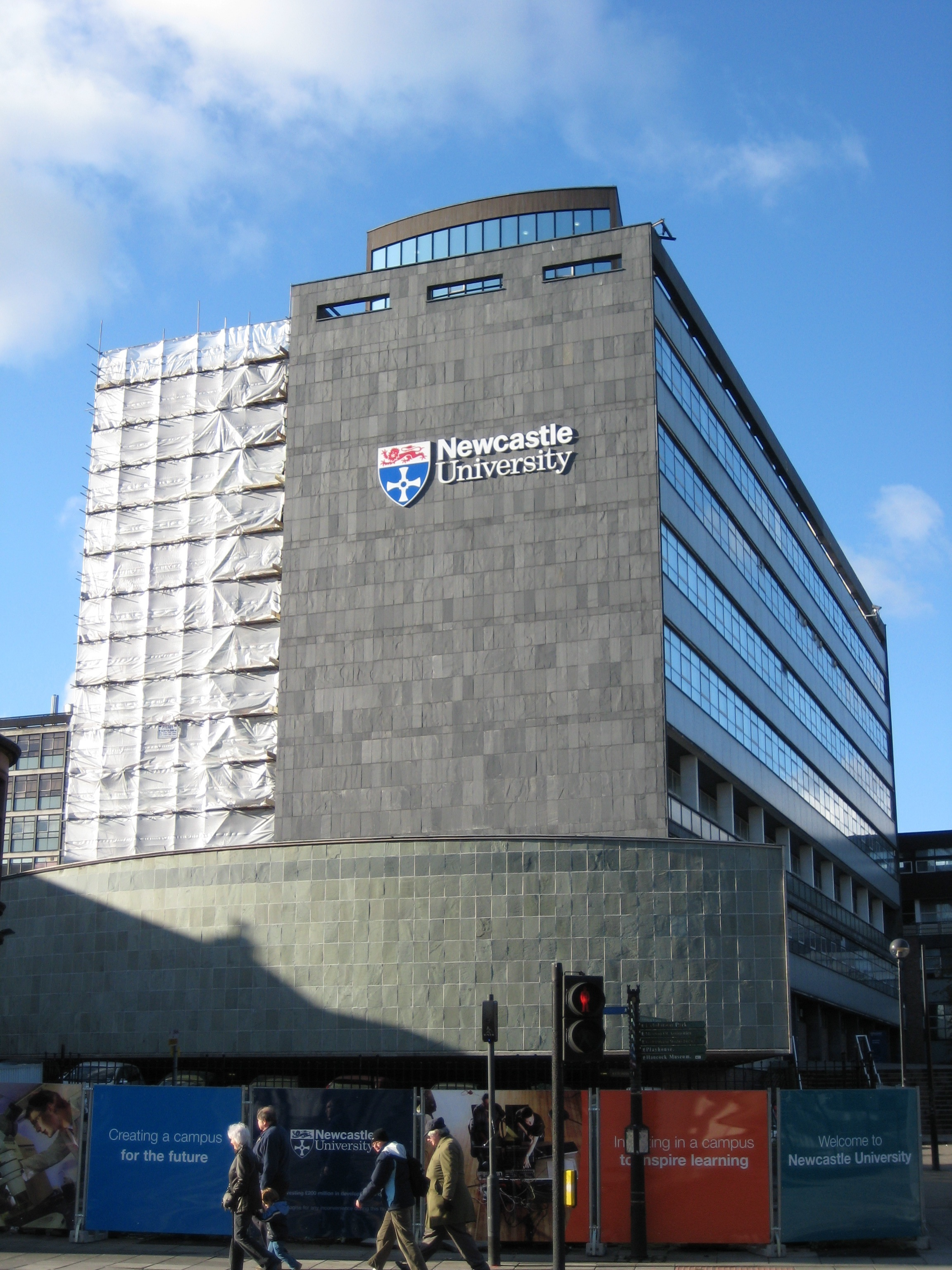
The Herschel Building, home to the School of Mathematics, Statistics and Physics, and several of the university's largest lecture theatres

Newcastle is a member of the Russell Group of 24 research-intensive universities. In the 2021 Research Excellence Framework (REF), which assesses the quality of research in UK higher education institutions, Newcastle is ranked joint 33rd by GPA (along with the University of Strathclyde and the University of Sussex) and 15th for research power (the grade point average score of a university, multiplied by the full-time equivalent number of researchers submitted).

== Student life ==
=== Students' union ===
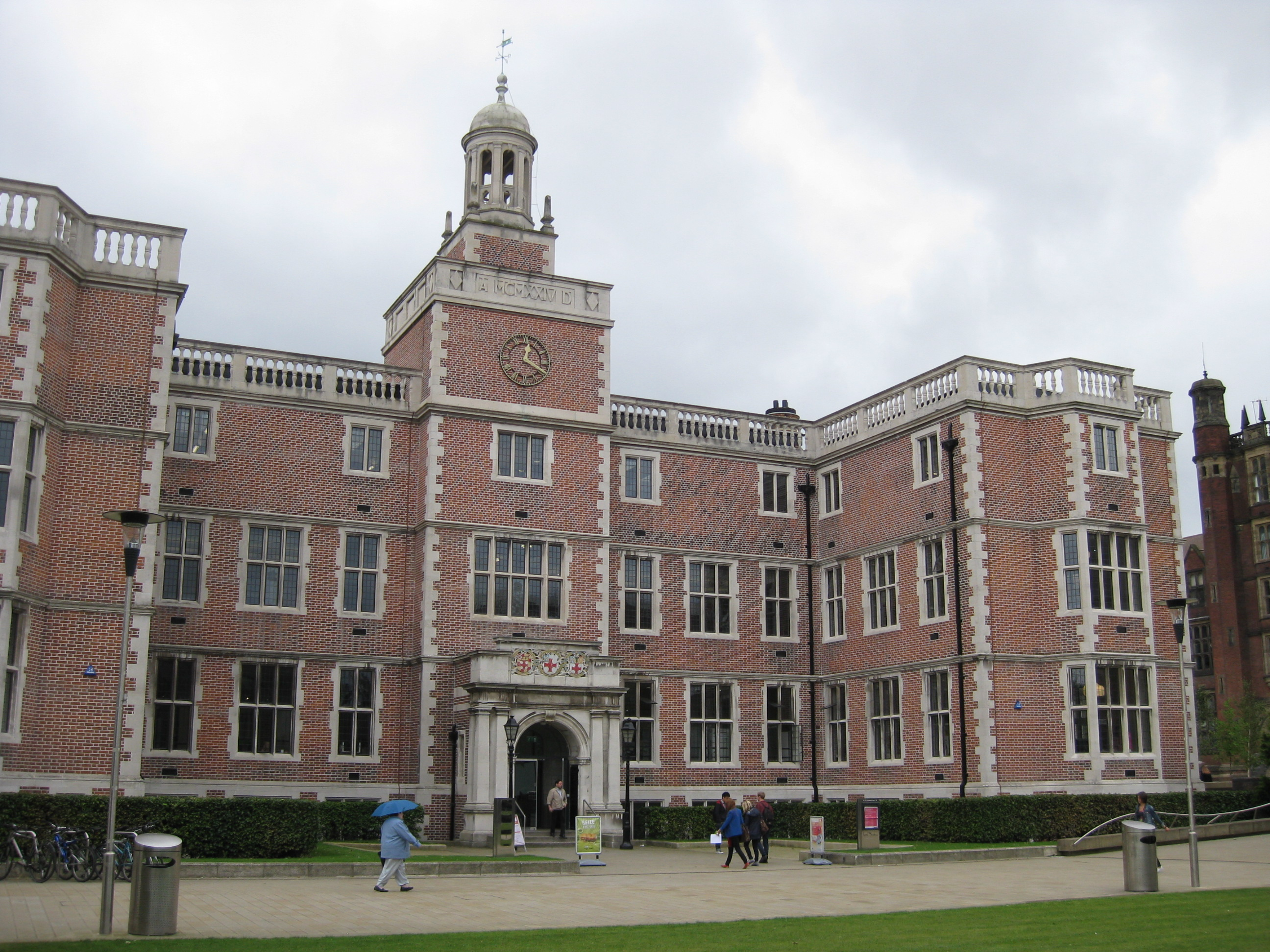
Students' Union following refurbishment, 2012

Newcastle University Students' Union (NUSU), known as the Union Society until a 2012 rebranding, includes student-run sports clubs and societies.

The Union building was built in 1924 following a generous gift from an anonymous donor, who is now believed to have been Sir Cecil Cochrane, a major benefactor to the university. It is built in the neo-Jacobean style and was designed by the local architect Robert Burns Dick. It was opened on 22 October 1925 by the Rt. Hon. Lord Eustace Percy, who later served as Rector of King's College from 1937 to 1952. It is a Grade II listed building. In 2010, the university donated £8 million towards a redevelopment project for the Union Building.

The Students' Union is run by seven paid sabbatical officers, including a Welfare and Equality Officer, and ten part-time unpaid officer positions. The former leader of the Liberal Democrats Tim Farron was President of NUSU in 1991–1992. The Students' Union also employs around 300 people in ancillary roles including bar staff and entertainment organisers.

The Courier is a weekly student newspaper. Established in 1948, the current weekly readership is around 12,000, most of whom are students at the university. The Courier has won The Guardian's Student Publication of the Year award twice in a row, in 2012 and 2013. It is published every Monday during term time.

Newcastle Student Radio is a student radio station based in the university. It produces shows on music, news, talk and sport and aims to cater for a wide range of musical tastes.

NUTV, known as TCTV from 2010 to 2017, is student television channel, first established in 2007. It produces live and on-demand content with coverage of events, as well as student-made programmes and shows.

=== Student exchange ===
Newcastle University has signed over 100 agreements with foreign universities allowing for student exchange to take place reciprocally.

=== Sport ===
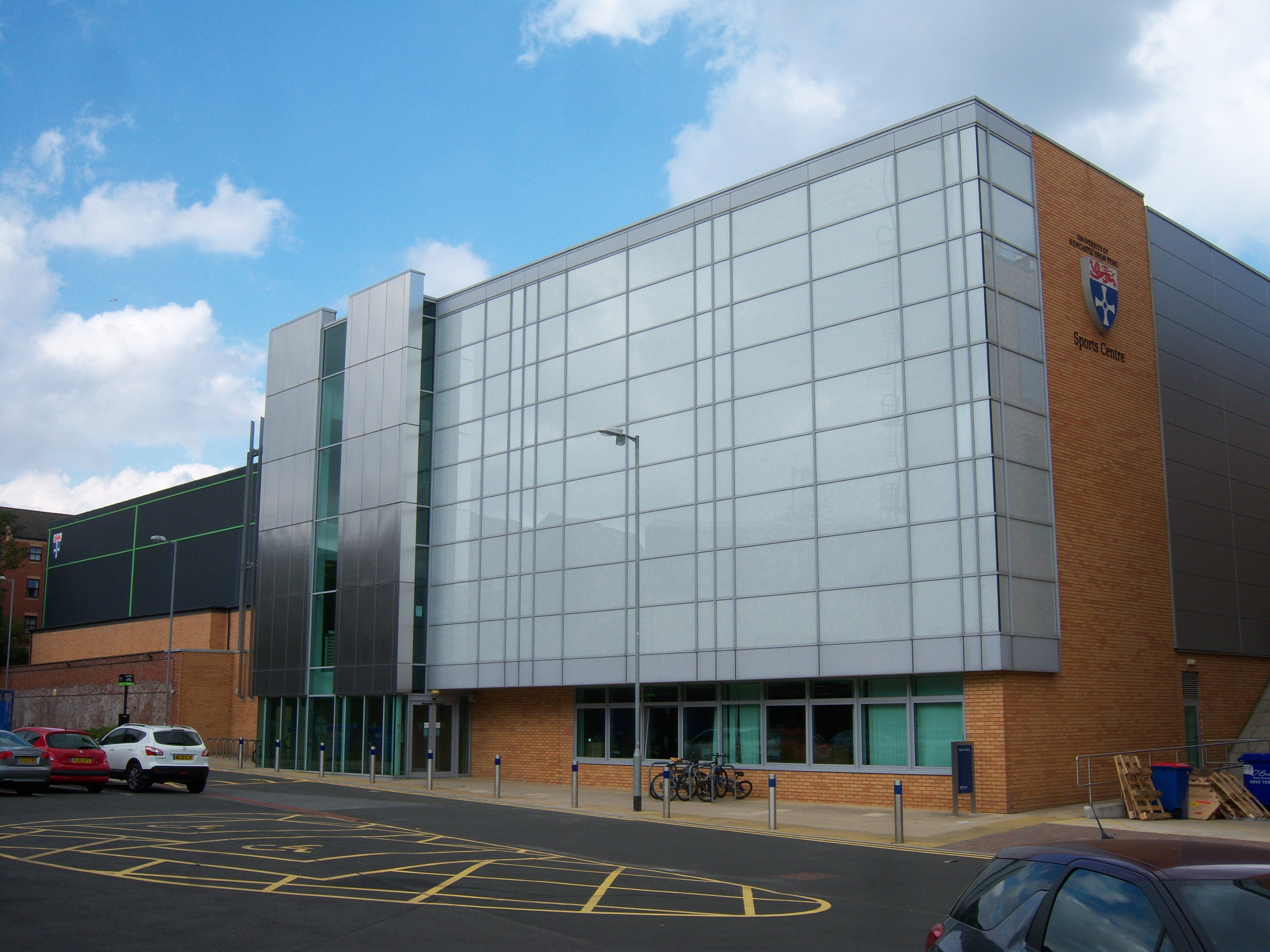
Sports Centre, Newcastle University

Newcastle is one of the leading universities for sport in the UK and is consistently ranked within the top 12 out of 152 higher education institutions in the British Universities and Colleges Sport (BUCS) rankings. More than 50 student-led sports clubs are supported through a team of professional staff and a network of indoor and outdoor sports facilities based over four sites. The university have a strong rugby history and were the winners of the Northumberland Senior Cup in 1965.

The university enjoys a friendly sporting rivalry with local universities. The Stan Calvert Cup was held between 1994 and 2018 by major sports teams from Newcastle and Northumbria University. The Boat Race of the North has also taken place between the rowing clubs of Newcastle and Durham University.

As of 2026, Newcastle University F.C. compete in men's senior football in the Northern League Division Two.

The university's Cochrane Park sports facility was a training venue for the teams playing football games at St James' Park for the 2012 London Olympics.

== See also ==
- Armorial of UK universities
- List of Newcastle University people
- List of modern universities in Europe (1801–1945)
- List of universities in the United Kingdom
- Rankings of universities in the United Kingdom
- Universities in the United Kingdom
