= INTO University Partnerships =

British for-profit education company

- Into Logo
- Company type: Private, for-profit
- Industry: Education
- Founded: 2005
- Founder: Andrew Colin
- Headquarters: Brighton, San Diego
- Website: intoglobal.com

INTO University Partnerships is a British for-profit pathway education provider focused on the provision of foundation courses for international students.

== History and ownership ==
INTO University Partnerships was founded in 2005 by Andrew Colin, who also founded INTO's rival in offering international pre-degree programmes, Study Group. Following a share placing in 2013, INTO placed one quarter of its equity with New York-based Leeds Equity Partners for £66m.

In their submission to the Home Affairs Select Committee on student visas in 2011, INTO said it had "welcomed and educated almost 21,000 students from more than 138 countries and territories to the UK and provide direct employment for close to 1,350 people in the UK alone".

A research report commissioned by NAFSA identified INTO University Partnerships as one of the eight third-party providers offering pathway programmes for international students in the United States.

In May 2018, it was reported that owner and founder Colin was seeking a buyer for his INTO University Partnerships. Looking to sell INTO for US$400.1 million, Colin hired Deutsche Bank to look at strategic options after receiving a number of takeover approaches.

== Issues with UCU and other universities ==
Several British universities approached by INTO decided not to proceed after consulting with their staff. After a survey of staff at the University of Essex, 90% rejected the proposed partnership. The objection to involvement with INTO was compounded by two things: that INTO does not recognise unions, and that Colin acknowledged that the rates offered were likely to be worse.

The International Centre for English Language Studies (ICELS) at Oxford Brookes University strongly opposed INTO's approach, and the University and College Union (UCU) claimed credit for this opposition influencing the university's decision.

In February 2007, the Times Higher Education published an article featuring the UCU's dispute of guarantees that INTO offered to existing Newcastle staff. Colin rejected the UCU criticism, saying in 2007, "Give me three years and I will show you it is possible to create secure, well-paid jobs in EAP, and more of them," and rejected the similarity of his business model to private finance initiatives.

Colin said of the lecturers' union in 2008, "I've asked for a dialogue with the UCU, but they won't talk to us. The union causes a lot of anxiety and talk about standards and job losses, they don't mention the fact that we are creating jobs and that the university is responsible for academic standards."

In July 2008, INTO threatened UCU with a legal suit for defamation, in response to a union briefing entitled "Into the unknown." The union removed the document from their website.

INTO announced that it had signed its first agreement in the United States in July 2008, to operate a foundation year programme for Oregon State University. OSU said that it had long wanted to expand the number of international students, and turned to INTO for its worldwide infrastructure and expertise in recruitment; some staff members, on the other hand, expressed concerns over working conditions. The programme was due to start in autumn 2009 with 150–200 students. A local news source, OregonLive, stated that the new venture would "replace the English Language Institute, a self-sustaining program that has helped international students learn English for 43 years," a move that filled its former director with concern.

INTO had been in preliminary discussion with several other British universities in 2008, the majority of which decided not to form a partnership, including University of Essex, Goldsmiths College and University of Westminster. Essex elected to restructure its own international operations, and Goldsmiths to suspend its internationalisation plans.

== INTO discussed by UK parliamentarians ==
In March 2008, INTO reached the parliamentary record when Member of Parliament (MP) Austin Mitchell asked why it had not filed financial records with Companies House, as it was legally obliged to do.

Colin said in Times Higher Education that the delay in submitting accounts was a "simple mistake." He also revealed that the first set of submitted accounts showed a loss of £1.7m, but stated that the company would be beyond the break-even point by the third year.

INTO's business model was welcomed by Bill Rammell, former minister of state in the Department for Innovation, Universities and Skills, in response to a question from Colchester MP Bob Russell.

== INTO Air controversy ==
According to the Civil Aviation Authority's (CAA) database on registered civil aircraft, a subsidiary, INTO Air, featured a Swiss-built Pilatus PC-12 aircraft with the registration G-INTO. An article in General Aviation magazine quoted the cost of these aircraft as starting at $4m and stated that Colin ordered a second aircraft for delivery in 2010.

INTO founder Colin credited the first corporate plane, which he had had for only a few months at the time of the interview, with transforming the way he and his UK team did business, removing much of the strain of travel, saying, "In one week we attended meetings in Glasgow and Newcastle on the Monday, Oxford and London on the Tuesday, Exeter and Birmingham on the Wednesday, Glasgow again on the Thursday and Norwich on the Friday." The registration of the plane has since been removed from the CAA database.

== INTO Giving ==
Since 2008, INTO Giving has raised more than US$1.6 million for children's education and humanitarian causes in Asia, Africa, the Americas, the Middle East and Europe. Funds are raised through INTO student, faculty and employee fundraising events and donations, and between 2015 and 2019 were matched penny for penny by INTO Founder and INTO Giving Trustee Andrew Colin.

INTO Giving has helped thousands of children and their teachers through 50 projects in 26 countries across five continents. The charity's projects have included building new and refurbishing rundown schools (India, Cambodia, China, Ghana, Malawi, Zambia, and in Lebanon for Syrian refugee children), psychological counselling services for Syrian refugee children, opening IT centres and libraries (Afghanistan, Bangladesh, Zambia), providing school meals and classroom supplies (Thailand) and refurbishing teacher accommodation (Ghana).

Since 2016, INTO Giving has prioritized supporting girls' education and refugee schoolchildren.

In the COVID-19 pandemic, INTO Giving donated $40,000 (£30,000 GBP) to coronavirus research and relief worldwide. In 2020 and 2021 the charity made strategic grants totaling $50,000 (approx £40,000 UK) toward civil rights and anti-discrimination organizations in the UK and US. INTO Giving is UK registered charity no 1126262 and a 501(c)(3) tax-exempt charity in the US. It is governed by a board of trustees.

== See also ==
- Business-education partnerships
- University Foundation Programme, a competitor system
- Kaplan, Inc., a competitor company
- English Language Institute, a common name for a university-based service that teaches English
- Study Group International, rival education provider also founded by INTO founder Andrew Colin
