= Lecture Notes in Computer Science =

Book series by Springer

- Discipline: Computer science
- Language: English
- Edited by: Gerard Goos, Juris Hartmanis

Publication details
- History: 1973–present
- Publisher: Springer Science+Business Media

Standard abbreviations
- ISO 4: Lect. Notes Comput. Sci.
- MathSciNet: Lecture Notes in Comput. Sci.

Indexing
- ISSN: 0302-9743 (print); 1611-3349 (web)
- OCLC no.: 884059121

Links
- Journal homepage; Online access; SpringerProfessional information

Lecture Notes in Computer Science is a series of computer science books published by Springer Science+Business Media since 1973.

== Overview ==
The series contains proceedings, post-proceedings, monographs, and Festschrifts. In addition, tutorials, state-of-the-art surveys, and "hot topics" are increasingly being included.

The series is indexed by DBLP.

== See also ==
- Monographiae Biologicae, another monograph series published by Springer Science+Business Media
- Lecture Notes in Physics
- Lecture Notes in Mathematics
- Electronic Workshops in Computing, published by the British Computer Society
