= Programming Languages: History and Fundamentals =

Early book on computer programming languages (1969)

- Dust jacket with Tower of Babel illustration
- Author: Jean E. Sammet
- Language: English
- Subject: Computer programming languages
- Publisher: Prentice Hall
- Publication date: 1969
- Publication place: United States
- OCLC: 847766251

Programming Languages: History and Fundamentals is a book about programming languages written by Jean E. Sammet. Published in 1969, the book gives an overview of the state of the art of programming in the late 1960s, and records the history of programming languages up to that time.

The book was considered a standard work on programming languages by professionals in the field. According to Dag Spicer, senior curator of the Computer History Museum, Programming Languages "was, and remains, a classic."

== Contents ==
Programming Languages provides a history and description of 120 programming languages, with an extensive bibliography of reference works about each language and sample programs for many of them. The book outlines both the technical definition and usage of each language, as well as the historical, political, and economic context of each language.

Because Sammet was deeply involved in the history of programming language creation in the United States, she was able to give an insider's perspective. The author excluded most programming languages used only outside the US, and excluded those she considered not to be high-level programming languages.

=== Languages ===
The book covers both well-known and obscure programming languages. Among the 120 languages included in the book are:

- ALGOL
- ALTRAN
- BASIC
- COBOL, co-created by Sammet herself
- COLINGO, from the mid-1960s, the name stands for Compile On-LINe and GO
- Culler-Fried
- FLOW-MATIC
- FORTRAN
- Klerer-May
- Laning and Zierler
- JOVIAL
- Lincoln Reckoner, an interactive, distributed mathematics program including matrix operations for the TX-2 computer
- MATHLAB
- Magic Paper, a symbolic mathematics system
- OMNITAB
- PL/1
- Protosynthex, a query language for English text
- SIMULA
- SNOBOL

== History ==
Sammet pioneered the COBOL language while working at Sylvania and FORMAC (an extension of FORTRAN) while at IBM. While managing IBM's Boston Advanced Programming Department, Sammet began researching programming languages more widely and collecting documentation. Starting in 1967 she published annual reports in Computers and Automation, the first computer magazine, on the languages in use across the field of programming.

Computers were new and rare in the 1960s, and were a subject of fascination that book publishers hoped to profit from. Prentice Hall approached Sammet asking her to write about FORTRAN. Sammet said that she would rather write about every programming language. Prentice Hall and IBM told her to go ahead.

Sammet used her book to advocate for high-level languages at a time when assembly languages were popular and there was widespread doubt about the value of high-level languages in the field of programming.

An image of the Tower of Babel was printed on the dust jacket of the book, with the names of various programming languages printed on the bricks making up the tower. A similar image had appeared on the January 1961 issue of the Communications of the ACM.

== See also ==
- The Art of Computer Programming
- The Preparation of Programs for an Electronic Digital Computer
- The C Programming Language
