= AT-3 =

AT-3 may be:

- AT III, a protein in the coagulation system that is activated by Heparin
- AIDC AT-3 of the Republic of China Air Force (Taiwan)
- AT-3 plane, Very Light Aircraft
- AT-3 Sagger, Soviet anti-tank missile
- AT-3 (MATH-MATIC) compiler for UNIVAC mainframe computers
- .at3, extension for audio files compressed with Sony's ATRAC3 algorithm
- Ar tonelico Qoga: Knell of Ar Ciel, a role-playing game for the PlayStation 3
