= AIMACO =

- Paradigm: imperative
- First appeared: 1959
- Platform: UNIVAC I

Influenced by
- FLOW-MATIC, COMTRAN

Influenced
- COBOL

AIMACO is an acronym for AIr MAterial COmpiler. It began around 1959 as the definition of a high level programming language influenced by the FLOW-MATIC language, developed by UNIVAC, and the COMTRAN (COMmercial TRANslator) programming language, developed by IBM. AIMACO, along with FLOW-MATIC and COMTRAN, were precursors to the COBOL programming language and influenced its development.

A committee chaired by a representative of AMC (the Air Material Command, predecessor to the Air Force Materiel Command) and composed of industry representatives from IBM and United States Steel, as well as members of AMC Programming Services, developed the draft AIMACO language definition. Even though the word "compiler" was part of its name, no compiler was ever written for it; although at least two were specified or designed.

The original intention of AMC was that all programming for AMC systems worldwide would be written in AIMACO and compiled on a UNIVAC in AMC headquarters at Wright-Patterson Air Force Base, Dayton, Ohio. This would be for software whether it was intended to operate on UNIVAC or IBM computers. An alternative compiler was designed by AMC Programming Services persons to compile systems on IBM computers for operation on IBM computers.
