= Bob Bemer =

American aerospace engineer (1920–2004)

- Born: Robert William Bemer; February 8, 1920; Sault Ste. Marie, Michigan, US
- Died: June 22, 2004 (aged 84); Possum Kingdom Lake, Texas, US
- Education: Albion College (B.A., Mathematics, 1940); Cranbrook Kingswood School
- Known for: Early work as a computer pioneer, standardizing ASCII
- Scientific career
- Fields: Computer science
- Workplaces: Douglas Aircraft Company, RAND Corporation, IBM, UNIVAC – Sperry Rand, Bull, General Electric, Honeywell
- Website: bobbemer.com

Robert William Bemer (February 8, 1920 – June 22, 2004) was a computer scientist best known for his work at IBM during the late 1950s and early 1960s.

== Early life and education ==
Born in Sault Ste. Marie, Michigan, Bemer graduated from Cranbrook Kingswood School in 1936 and took a Bachelor of Arts (B.A.) in mathematics at Albion College in 1940. He earned a certificate in aeronautical engineering at Curtiss-Wright Technical Institute in 1941.

== Career ==
Bemer began his career as an aerodynamicist at Douglas Aircraft Company in 1941, then worked for RAND Corporation from 1951, IBM from 1957, UNIVAC – Sperry Rand in 1965, Bull from 1965, General Electric from 1970, and Honeywell from 1974.

He served on the committee which amalgamated the design for his COMTRAN language with Grace Hopper's FLOW-MATIC and thus produced the specifications for COBOL. He also served, with Hugh McGregor Ross and others, on the separate committee which defined the ASCII character codeset in 1960, contributing several characters which were not formerly used by computers including the escape (ESC), backslash (\), and curly brackets ({}). As a result, he is sometimes known as The Father of ASCII. In 2000, Bemer claimed to have proposed the term octet (rather than Werner Buchholz' byte) while heading software development at Cie. Bull, France, between 1965 and 1966. He also proposed the term hextet for 16-bit groups.

Bemer is probably the earliest proponent of the software factory concept. He mentioned it in his 1968 paper "The economics of program production".

Other notable contributions to computing include the first publication of the time-sharing concept in 1957 and the first attempts to prepare for the Year 2000 problem in publications as early as 1971. Acting in an advisory capacity, Bemer and Honeywell employees Eric Clamons and Richard Keys developed the Text Executive Programming Language (TEX).

In the late 1990s, as a retiree, Bemer invented an approach to Year 2000 (Y2K) date conversion, to avoid anticipated problems when dates without centuries were compared in programs for which source code was unavailable. This involved detecting six and eight character operations at runtime and checking their operands, adjusting the comparison so that low years in the new century did not appear to precede the last years of the twentieth century.

Bob Bemer maintained an extensive collection of archival material on early computer software development at www.bobbemer.com.

== Death ==
Bemer died at his home in Possum Kingdom Lake, Texas in 2004 at age 84 after a battle with cancer.
