= CobolScript =

Programming language

CobolScript is a programming language created by Matthew Dean and Charles Schereda of Deskware in 1999. The language was intended to provide web-enabled COBOL, and was targeted at businesses using legacy software written in that language.
