= FORMAC =

Computer algebra system based on FORTRAN

FORMAC, the Formula Manipulation Compiler, was the first computer algebra system to have significant use. It was developed by Jean E. Sammet and her team, as an extension of FORTRAN IV. The compiler was implemented as a preprocessor taking the FORMAC program and converting it to a FORTRAN IV program which was in turn compiled without further user intervention.

Initial development started in 1962 and was complete by April 1964. In November it was released to IBM customers.

FORMAC supported computation, manipulation, and use of symbolic expressions. In addition it supported rational arithmetic.

== See also ==
- ALTRAN

== Bibliography ==
- Sammet, Jean E. (1990). "Symbolic Computation : The Early Days (1950–1971)". In Chudnovsky, V.; Jenks, R. D. (eds.). Computers in Mathematics. Taylor & Francis. pp. 351–366. ISBN 0-8247-8341-7.
- Sammet, Jean E. (1993). "The beginning and development of FORMAC (FORmula MAnipulation Compiler)". Proceedings of HOPL-II, The second ACM SIGPLAN conference on History of programming languages. pp. 209–230. doi:10.1145/154766.155372. ISBN 0-89791-570-4.
- Rosenthal, Myron R. (1966). "Extension to FORTRAN IV and FORMAC". Numerical Methods in Computer Programming. Homewood: Irwin. pp. 159–231. OCLC 312989.
