= COBOL =

Programming language with English-like syntax

- The COBOL 60 report to CODASYL (April 1960)
- Paradigm: Procedural, imperative, object-oriented, generic
- Designed by: Howard Bromberg, Norman Discount, Vernon Reeves, Jean E. Sammet, William Selden, Gertrude Tierney, with indirect influence from Grace Hopper
- Developers: CODASYL, ANSI, ISO/IEC
- First appeared: 1960; 66 years ago
- Stable release: ISO/IEC 1989:2023 / 2023
- Typing discipline: Weak, static
- Filename extensions: .cbl, .cob, .cpy

Major implementations
- GnuCOBOL, IBM COBOL, GCC, Micro Focus Visual COBOL

Dialects
- COBOL/2, DEC COBOL-10, DEC PDP-11 COBOL, DEC PDP-11 COBOL-85, DEC VAX COBOL, DOSVS COBOL, Envyr ICOBOL, Fujitsu COBOL, Hitachi COBOL2002, HP3000 COBOL/II, IBM COBOL SAA, IBM COBOL/400, IBM COBOL/II, IBM Enterprise COBOL, IBM ILE COBOL, IBM OS/VS COBOL, ICL COBOL (VME), Micro Focus ACUCOBOL-GT, Micro Focus COBOL-IT, Micro Focus RM/COBOL, Micro Focus Visual COBOL, Microsoft COBOL, Raincode COBOL, Realia COBOL, Ryan McFarland RM/COBOL, Ryan McFarland RM/COBOL-85, Tandem (NonStop) COBOL, Tandem (NonStop) SCOBOL, UNIVAC COBOL, Unisys MCP COBOL74, Unisys MCP COBOL85, X/Open COBOL, Veryant isCOBOL, Wang VS COBOL, WATBOL

Influenced by
- Initial: AIMACO, COMTRAN, FACT, FLOW-MATIC; COBOL 2002: (Note: Specifically influenced COBOL 2002's object-oriented features.) C++, Eiffel, Smalltalk

Influenced
- CobolScript, EGL, PL/I, PL/B

COBOL (Common Business-Oriented Language; /ˈkoʊbɒl, -bɔːl/) is a compiled English-like computer programming language designed for business use. It is an imperative, procedural, and, since 2002, object-oriented language. COBOL is primarily used in business, finance, and administrative systems for companies and governments. COBOL is still widely used in applications deployed on mainframe computers, such as large-scale batch and transaction processing jobs. Many large financial institutions were developing new systems in the language as late as 2006, but most programming in COBOL today is purely to maintain existing applications. Programs are being moved to new platforms, rewritten in modern languages, or replaced with other software.

COBOL's design was started in 1959 by CODASYL and was partly based on the programming language FLOW-MATIC, designed by Grace Hopper. It was created as part of a US Department of Defense effort to create a portable programming language for data processing. It was originally seen as a stopgap, but the Defense Department promptly pressured computer manufacturers to provide it, resulting in its widespread adoption. It was standardized in 1968 and has been revised five times. Expansions include support for structured and object-oriented programming. The current standard is ISO/IEC 1989:2023.

COBOL statements have prose syntax such as MOVE x TO y, which was designed to be self-documenting and highly readable. However, it is verbose and uses over 300 reserved words compared to the succinct and mathematically inspired syntax of other languages. Lacking a large standard library, the standard specifies 43 statements, 87 functions, and just one class. COBOL code is split into four divisions (identification, environment, data, and procedure), containing a rigid hierarchy of sections, paragraphs, and sentences.

COBOL has been criticized for its verbosity, design process, and poor support for structured programming. These weaknesses often result in monolithic programs that are hard to comprehend as a whole, despite their local readability.

== History and specification ==
Timeline of COBOL language
Year	Informal name	Official Standard
1960	COBOL-60	—N/a
1961	COBOL-61	—N/a
1963	COBOL-61 Extended	—N/a
1965	COBOL-65	—N/a
1968	COBOL-68	ANSI INCITS X3.23-1968
1974	COBOL-74	ANSI INCITS X3.23-1974; ISO 1989:1978
1985	COBOL-85	ANSI INCITS X3.23-1985; ISO 1989:1985
1989	COBOL-85	ANSI INCITS X3.23a-1989; ISO 1989:1985/Amd 1:1992
1993	COBOL-85	ANSI INCITS X3.23b-1993; ISO 1989:1985/Amd 2:1994
2002	COBOL-2002	ISO/IEC 1989:2002
2006	COBOL-2002	ISO/IEC 1989:2002/Cor 1:2006
2006	COBOL-2002	ISO/IEC 1989:2002/Cor 2:2006
2009	COBOL-2002	ISO/IEC 1989:2002/Cor 3:2009
2014	COBOL-2014	ISO/IEC 1989:2014
2023	COBOL-2023	ISO/IEC 1989:2023

=== Background ===
In the late 1950s, computer users and manufacturers were becoming concerned about the rising cost of programming. A 1959 survey had found that in any data processing installation, the programming cost US$800,000 on average and that translating programs to run on new hardware would cost US$600,000. At a time when new programming languages were proliferating, the same survey suggested that if a common business-oriented language were used, conversion would be far cheaper and faster.

On 8 April 1959, Mary K. Hawes, a computer scientist at Burroughs Corporation, called a meeting of representatives from academia, computer users, and manufacturers at the University of Pennsylvania to organize a formal meeting on common business languages. Representatives included Grace Hopper (inventor of the English-like data processing language FLOW-MATIC), Jean Sammet, and Saul Gorn.

At the April meeting, the group asked the Department of Defense (DoD) to sponsor an effort to create a common business language. The delegation impressed Charles A. Phillips, director of the Data System Research Staff at the DoD, who thought that they "thoroughly understood" the DoD's problems. The DoD operated 225 computers, had 175 more on order, and had spent over $200 million on implementing programs to run on them. Portable programs would save time, reduce costs, and ease modernization.

Charles Phillips agreed to sponsor the meeting, and tasked the delegation with drafting the agenda.

=== COBOL 60 ===
On 28 and 29 May 1959, a meeting was held at the Pentagon to discuss the creation of a common programming language for business (exactly one year after the Zürich ALGOL 58 meeting). It was attended by 41 people and was chaired by Phillips. The Department of Defense was concerned about whether it could run the same data processing programs on different computers. FORTRAN, the only mainstream language at the time, lacked the features needed to write such programs.

Representatives enthusiastically described a language that could work in a wide variety of environments, from banking and insurance to utilities and inventory control. They agreed unanimously that more people should be able to program, and that the new language should not be restricted by the limitations of contemporary technology. A majority agreed that the language should make maximal use of English, be capable of change, be machine-independent, and be easy to use, even at the expense of power.

The meeting resulted in the creation of a steering committee and short, intermediate, and long-range committees. The short-range committee was given until September (three months) to produce specifications for an interim language, which would then be improved upon by the other committees. Their official mission, however, was to identify the strengths and weaknesses of existing programming languages; it did not explicitly direct them to create a new language.

The deadline was met with disbelief by the short-range committee. One member, Betty Holberton, described the three-month deadline as "gross optimism" and doubted that the language really would be a stopgap. The steering committee met on 4 June and agreed to name the entire activity the Committee on Data Systems Languages, or CODASYL, and to form an executive committee.

The short-range committee members represented six computer manufacturers and three government agencies. The computer manufacturers were Burroughs Corporation, IBM, Minneapolis-Honeywell (Honeywell Labs), RCA, Sperry Rand, and Sylvania Electric Products. The government agencies were the U.S. Air Force, the Navy's David Taylor Model Basin, and the National Bureau of Standards (now the National Institute of Standards and Technology). The committee was chaired by Joseph Wegstein of the U.S. National Bureau of Standards. Work began by investigating data descriptions, statements, existing applications, and user experiences.

The committee mainly examined the FLOW-MATIC, AIMACO, and COMTRAN programming languages. The FLOW-MATIC language was particularly influential because it had been implemented and because AIMACO was a derivative of it with only minor changes. FLOW-MATIC's inventor, Grace Hopper, also served as a technical adviser to the committee. FLOW-MATIC's major contributions to COBOL were long variable names, English words for commands, and the separation of data descriptions and instructions. Hopper is sometimes called "the mother of COBOL" or "the grandmother of COBOL", although Jean Sammet, a lead designer of COBOL, said Hopper "was not the mother, creator, or developer of COBOL."

IBM's COMTRAN language, invented by Bob Bemer, was regarded as a competitor to FLOW-MATIC by a short-range committee made up of colleagues of Grace Hopper. Some of its features were not incorporated into COBOL so that it would not look like IBM had dominated the design process, and Jean Sammet said in 1981 that there had been a "strong anti-IBM bias" from some committee members (herself included). In one case, after Roy Goldfinger, author of the COMTRAN manual and intermediate-range committee member, attended a subcommittee meeting to support his language and encourage the use of algebraic expressions, Grace Hopper sent a memo to the short-range committee reiterating Sperry Rand's efforts to create a language based on English.

In 1980, Grace Hopper commented that "COBOL 60 is 95% FLOW-MATIC" and that COMTRAN had had an "extremely small" influence. Furthermore, she said that she would claim that work was influenced by both FLOW-MATIC and COMTRAN only to "keep other people happy [so they] wouldn't try to knock us out.".

Features from COMTRAN incorporated into COBOL included formulas, the PICTURE clause, an improved IF statement which obviated the need for GO TOs, and a more robust file management system.

The usefulness of the committee's work was a subject of great debate. While some members thought the language had too many compromises and was the result of design by committee, others felt it was better than the three languages examined. Some felt the language was too complex; others, too simple.

Controversial features included those some considered useless or too advanced for data processing users. Such features included Boolean expressions, formulas, and table subscripts (indices). Another point of controversy was whether to make keywords context-sensitive and the effect that would have on readability. Although context-sensitive keywords were rejected, the approach was later used in PL/I and partially in COBOL from 2002. Little consideration was given to interactivity, interaction with operating systems (few existed at that time), and functions (thought of as purely mathematical and of no use in data processing).

The specifications were presented to the executive committee on 4 September. They fell short of expectations: Joseph Wegstein noted that "it contains rough spots and requires some additions," and Bob Bemer later described them as a "hodgepodge." The committee was given until December to improve it.

At a mid-September meeting, the committee discussed the new language's name. Suggestions included "BUSY" (Business System), "INFOSYL" (Information System Language), and "COCOSYL" (Common Computer Systems Language). It is unclear who coined the name "COBOL", although Bob Bemer later claimed it had been his suggestion.

In October, the intermediate-range committee received copies of the FACT language specification created by Roy Nutt. Its features impressed the committee so much that they passed a resolution to base COBOL on it.

This was a blow to the short-range committee, who had made good progress on the specification. Despite being technically superior, FACT had not been created with portability in mind or through manufacturer and user consensus. It also lacked a demonstrable implementation, allowing supporters of a FLOW-MATIC-based COBOL to overturn the resolution. RCA representative Howard Bromberg also blocked FACT, so that RCA's work on a COBOL implementation would not go to waste.

It soon became apparent that the committee was too large to make any further progress quickly. A frustrated Howard Bromberg bought a $15 tombstone (in 1959; equivalent to $170 in 2025) with "COBOL" engraved on it and sent it to Charles Phillips to demonstrate his displeasure. (Note: The tombstone is currently at the Computer History Museum.)

A subcommittee was formed to analyze existing languages and was made up of six individuals:

- William Selden and Gertrude Tierney of IBM,
- Howard Bromberg and Howard Discount of RCA,
- Vernon Reeves and Jean E. Sammet of Sylvania Electric Products.

The subcommittee did most of the work creating the specification, leaving the short-range committee to review and modify their work before producing the finished specification.

The specifications were approved by the executive committee on 8 January 1960, and sent to the government printing office, which printed them as COBOL 60. The language's stated objectives were to allow efficient, portable programs to be easily written, to allow users to move to new systems with minimal effort and cost, and to be suitable for inexperienced programmers.

The CODASYL Executive Committee later created the COBOL Maintenance Committee to answer questions from users and vendors and to improve and expand the specifications.

During 1960, the list of manufacturers planning to build COBOL compilers grew. By September, five more manufacturers had joined CODASYL (Bendix, Control Data Corporation, General Electric (GE), National Cash Register, and Philco), and all represented manufacturers had announced COBOL compilers. GE and IBM planned to integrate COBOL into their own languages, GECOM and COMTRAN, respectively. In contrast, International Computers and Tabulators planned to replace their language, CODEL, with COBOL.

Meanwhile, RCA and Sperry Rand worked on creating COBOL compilers. The first COBOL program ran on 17 August on an RCA 501. On 6 and 7 December, the same COBOL program (albeit with minor changes) ran on an RCA computer and a Remington-Rand Univac computer, demonstrating that compatibility could be achieved.

The relative influence of the languages that were used is still indicated in the recommended advisory printed in all COBOL reference manuals:

COBOL is an industry language and is not the property of any company or group of companies, or of any organization or group of organizations.

No warranty, expressed or implied, is made by any contributor or by the CODASYL COBOL Committee as to the accuracy and functioning of the programming system and language. Moreover, no responsibility is assumed by any contributor or by the committee in connection therewith. The authors and copyright holders of the copyrighted material used herein are as follows:

FLOW-MATIC (trademark of Unisys Corporation), Programming for the UNIVAC (R) I and II, Data Automation Systems, copyrighted 1958, 1959, by Unisys Corporation; IBM Commercial Translator Form No. F28-8013, copyrighted 1959 by IBM; FACT, DSI 27A5260-2760, copyrighted 1960 by Minneapolis-Honeywell.

They have specifically authorized the use of this material, in whole or in part, in the COBOL specifications. Such authorization extends to the reproduction and use of COBOL specifications in programming manuals or similar publications.

=== COBOL-61 to COBOL-65 ===
It is rather unlikely that COBOL will be around by the end of the decade.

— Anonymous, June 1960

Many logical flaws were found in COBOL 60, leading General Electric's Charles Katz to warn that it could not be interpreted unambiguously. A reluctant short-term committee performed a total cleanup, and, by March 1963, it was reported that COBOL's syntax was as definable as ALGOL's, although semantic ambiguities remained.

Early COBOL compilers were primitive and slow. COBOL is a difficult language to write a compiler for, due to the large syntax and many optional elements within syntactic constructs, as well as the need to generate efficient code for a language with many possible data representations, implicit type conversions, and necessary set-ups for I/O operations. A 1962 US Navy evaluation found compilation speeds of 3–11 statements per minute. By mid-1964, they had increased to 11–1000 statements per minute. It was observed that increasing memory would drastically increase speed and that compilation costs varied wildly: costs per statement were between $0.23 and $18.91.

In late 1962, IBM announced that COBOL would be their primary development language and that development of COMTRAN would cease.

The COBOL specification was revised three times in the five years after its publication. COBOL-60 was replaced in 1961 by COBOL-61. This was then replaced by the COBOL-61 Extended specifications in 1963, which introduced the sort and report writer facilities. The added facilities corrected flaws identified by Honeywell in late 1959 in a letter to the short-range committee. COBOL Edition 1965 brought further clarifications to the specifications and introduced facilities for handling mass storage files and tables.

=== COBOL-68 ===
Efforts began to standardize COBOL to overcome incompatibilities between versions. In late 1962, both ISO and the United States of America Standards Institute (now ANSI) formed groups to create standards. ANSI produced USA Standard COBOL X3.23 in August 1968, which became the cornerstone for later versions. This version was known as American National Standard (ANS) COBOL and was adopted by ISO in 1972.

=== COBOL-74 ===
By 1970, COBOL had become the most widely used programming language in the world.

Independently of the ANSI committee, the CODASYL Programming Language Committee was working on improving the language. They described new versions in 1968, 1969, 1970, and 1973, including changes such as new inter-program communication, debugging, and file merging facilities, as well as improved string handling and library inclusion features.

Although CODASYL was independent of the ANSI committee, the CODASYL Journal of Development was used by ANSI to identify features that were popular enough to warrant implementing. The Programming Language Committee also liaised with ECMA and the Japanese COBOL Standard committee.

The Programming Language Committee was not well-known, however. The vice president, William Rinehuls, complained that two-thirds of the COBOL community did not know of the committee's existence. It also lacked the funds to make public documents, such as minutes of meetings and change proposals, freely available.

In 1974, ANSI published a revised version of (ANS) COBOL, containing new features such as file organizations, the DELETE statement and the segmentation module. Deleted features included the NOTE statement, the EXAMINE statement (which was replaced by INSPECT), and the implementer-defined random access module (which was superseded by the new sequential and relative I/O modules). These made up 44 changes, which rendered existing statements incompatible with the new standard. The report writer was slated to be removed from COBOL but was reinstated before the standard was published. ISO later adopted the updated standard in 1978.

=== COBOL-85 ===
In June 1978, work began on revising COBOL-74. The proposed standard (commonly called COBOL-80) differed significantly from the previous one, causing concerns about incompatibility and conversion costs. In January 1981, Joseph T. Brophy, Senior Vice-president of Travelers Insurance, threatened to sue the standard committee because it was not upwards compatible with COBOL-74. Mr. Brophy described previous conversions of their 40-million-line code base as "non-productive" and a "complete waste of our programmer resources". Later that year, the Data Processing Management Association (DPMA) said it was "strongly opposed" to the new standard, citing "prohibitive" conversion costs and enhancements that were "forced on the user".

During the first public review period, the committee received 2,200 responses, of which 1,700 were negative form letters. Other responses were detailed analyses of the effect COBOL-80 would have on their systems; conversion costs were predicted to be at least 50 cents per line of code. Fewer than a dozen of the responses were in favor of the proposed standard.

ISO TC97-SC5 installed in 1979 the international COBOL Experts Group, on the initiative of Wim Ebbinkhuijsen. The group consisted of COBOL experts from many countries, including the United States. Its goal was to achieve mutual understanding and respect between ANSI and the rest of the world with regard to the need for new COBOL features. After three years, ISO changed the status of the group to a formal Working Group: WG 4 COBOL. The group took primary ownership and development of the COBOL standard, where ANSI made most of the proposals.

In 1983, the DPMA withdrew its opposition to the standard, citing the responsiveness of the committee to public concerns. In the same year, a National Bureau of Standards study concluded that the proposed standard would present few problems. A year later, DEC released a VAX/VMS COBOL-80, and noted that conversion of COBOL-74 programs posed few problems. The new EVALUATE statement and inline PERFORM were particularly well received and improved productivity, thanks to simplified control flow and debugging.

The second public review drew another 1,000 (mainly negative) responses, while the last drew just 25, by which time many concerns had been addressed.

In 1985, the ISO Working Group 4 accepted the then-version of the ANSI proposed standard, made several changes and set it as the new ISO standard COBOL 85. It was published in late 1985.

Sixty features were changed or deprecated and 115 were added, such as:

- Scope terminators (END-IF, END-PERFORM, END-READ, etc.)
- Nested subprograms
- CONTINUE, a no-operation statement
- EVALUATE, a switch statement
- INITIALIZE, a statement that can set groups of data to their default values
- Inline PERFORM loop bodies – previously, loop bodies had to be specified in a separate procedure
- Reference modification, which allows access to substrings
- I/O status codes.

The new standard was adopted by all national standard bodies, including ANSI.

Two amendments followed in 1989, and 1993. The first one introduced Intrinsic function Module, and the latter provided corrections.

=== COBOL 2002 and object-oriented COBOL ===
In 1997, Gartner Group estimated that there were a total of 200 billion lines of COBOL in existence, which ran 80% of all business programs. (Note: The reader should be cautioned that although the 1997 Gartner Group study is referenced ubiquitously with a famous "200 billion lines of COBOL" quote, the actual report is difficult to find. Moreover, some speculate that "the only involvement of Gartner in these numbers" was the 1995 study which "projected that fixing the Y2K bug would cost $1 per line or $300 billion total," which caused the misinterpretation of the report.)

In the early 1990s, work began on adding object-oriented programming in the next full revision of COBOL. Object-oriented features were taken from C++ and Smalltalk.

The initial estimate was to have this revision completed by 1997, and an ISO Committee Draft (CD) was available by 1997. Some vendors (including Micro Focus, Fujitsu, and IBM) introduced object-oriented syntax based on drafts of the full revision. The final approved ISO standard was approved and published in late 2002.

Fujitsu/GTSoftware, Micro Focus introduced object-oriented COBOL compilers targeting the .NET Framework.

There were many other new features, many of which had been in the CODASYL COBOL Journal of Development since 1978 and had missed the opportunity to be included in COBOL-85. These other features included:

- Free-form code
- User-defined functions
- Recursion
- Locale-based processing
- Support for extended character sets such as Unicode
- Floating-point and binary data types (until then, binary items were truncated based on their declaration's base-10 specification)
- Portable arithmetic results
- Bit and Boolean data types
- Pointers and syntax for getting and freeing storage
- The SCREEN SECTION for text-based user interfaces
- The VALIDATE facility
- Improved interoperability with other programming languages and framework environments such as .NET and Java.

Three corrigenda were published for the standard: two in 2006 and one in 2009.

=== COBOL 2014 ===
Between 2003 and 2009, three Technical Reports (TRs) were produced describing object finalization, XML processing and collection classes for COBOL.

COBOL 2002 suffered from poor support: no compilers completely supported the standard. Micro Focus found that it was due to a lack of user demand for the new features and due to the abolition of the NIST test suite, which had been used to test compiler conformance. The standardization process was also found to be slow and under-resourced.

COBOL 2014 includes the following changes:

- Major features have been made optional, such as the VALIDATE facility, the report writer and the screen-handling facility
- Dynamic capacity tables (a feature dropped from the draft of COBOL 2002)
- Portable arithmetic results have been replaced by IEEE 754 data types
- Method overloading

=== COBOL 2023 ===
The COBOL 2023 standard added a few new features:

- Asynchronous messaging syntax using the SEND and RECEIVE statements
- A transaction processing facility with COMMIT and ROLLBACK
- XOR logical operator
- The CONTINUE statement can be extended as to pause the program for a specified duration
- A DELETE FILE statement
- LINE SEQUENTIAL file organization
- Defined infinite looping with PERFORM UNTIL EXIT
- SUBSTITUTE intrinsic function allowing for substring substitution of different length
- CONVERT function for base-conversion
- Boolean shifting operators

gcobol, from GCC 15.1, is based on this standard.

== Legacy ==
COBOL programs are used globally in governments and various industries including retail, travel, finance, and healthcare. Testimony before the United States House Committee on Oversight and Government Reform in 2016 indicated that COBOL is still in use by many federal agencies such as the United States Department of Agriculture (USDA), Department of Homeland Security (DHS), Department of Health and Human Services (HHS), United States Department of Justice, United States Department of the Treasury, and United States Department of Veterans Affairs (VA), as well as the Internal Revenue Service (IRS).

COBOL currently runs on diverse operating systems such as z/OS, z/VSE, VME, Unix, NonStop OS, OpenVMS and Windows. In 1997, the Gartner Group reported that 80% of the world's business ran on COBOL with over 200 billion lines of code and 5 billion lines more being written annually. As of 2020, COBOL ran background processes 95% of the time a credit or debit card was swiped.

=== Y2K ===
Near the end of the 20th century, the year 2000 problem (Y2K) was the focus of significant COBOL programming effort, sometimes by the same programmers who had designed the systems decades before. The particular level of effort required to correct COBOL code has been attributed to the large amount of business-oriented COBOL, as business applications use dates heavily, and to fixed-length data fields. Some studies attribute as much as "24% of Y2K software repair costs to COBOL". After the clean-up effort put into these programs for Y2K, a 2003 survey found that many remained in use. The authors said that the survey data suggest "a gradual decline in the importance of COBOL in application development over the [following] 10 years unless ... integration with other languages and technologies can be adopted".

=== Modernization efforts ===
In 2006 and 2012, Computerworld surveys (of 352 readers) found that over 60% of organizations used COBOL (more than C++ and Visual Basic .NET) and that for half of those, COBOL was used for the majority of their internal software. 36% of managers said they planned to migrate from COBOL, and 25% said that they would do so if not for the expense of rewriting legacy code. Alternatively, some businesses have migrated their COBOL programs from mainframes to cheaper, faster hardware.

By 2019, the number of COBOL programmers was shrinking fast due to retirements, leading to an impending skills gap in business and government organizations which still use mainframe systems for high-volume transaction processing. Efforts to rewrite COBOL systems in newer languages have proven expensive and problematic, as has the outsourcing of code maintenance, thus proposals to train more people in COBOL are advocated.

Several banks have undertaken multi-year COBOL modernization efforts, sometimes resulting in widespread service disruptions that result in fines.

During the COVID-19 pandemic and the ensuing surge of unemployment, several US states reported a shortage of skilled COBOL programmers to support the legacy systems used for unemployment benefit management. Many of these systems had been in the process of conversion to more modern programming languages prior to the pandemic, but the process was put on hold. Similarly, the US Internal Revenue Service rushed to patch its COBOL-based Individual Master File in order to disburse the tens of millions of payments mandated by the Coronavirus Aid, Relief, and Economic Security Act.

COBOL has been assumed as a programming language for business operations in mainframes, although in recent years, many COBOL operations have been moved to cloud computing.

In 2024, the IRS announced a transition from COBOL to Java thanks to the Digital First Initiative.

== Features ==
=== Syntax ===
COBOL has an English-like syntax, which is used to describe nearly everything in COBOL programs. For example, a condition can be expressed as x IS GREATER THAN y or more concisely as x GREATER y or x > y. More complex conditions can be abbreviated by removing repeated conditions and variables. For example, a > b AND a > c OR a = d can be shortened to a > b AND c OR = d. To support this syntax, COBOL has over 300 keywords. (Note: Vendor-specific extensions cause many implementations to have far more: one implementation recognizes over 1,100 keywords.) Some of the keywords are simple alternative or pluralized spellings of the same word, which provides for more grammatically appropriate statements and clauses; e.g., the IN and OF keywords can be used interchangeably, as can TIME and TIMES, and VALUE and VALUES.

Each COBOL program is made up of four basic lexical items: words, literals, picture character-strings and separators. Words include reserved words and user-defined identifiers. They are up to 31 characters long and may include letters, digits, hyphens and underscores. Literals include numerals (e.g. 12) and strings (e.g. 'Hello!'). Separators include the space character and commas and semicolons followed by a space.

A COBOL program is split into four divisions: the identification division, the environment division, the data division and the procedure division. The identification division specifies the name and type of the source element and is where classes and interfaces are specified. The environment division specifies any program features that depend on the system running it, such as files and character sets. The data division is used to declare variables and parameters. The procedure division contains the program's statements. Each division is sub-divided into sections, which are made up of paragraphs.

==== Metalanguage ====
COBOL's syntax is usually described with a unique metalanguage using braces, brackets, bars and underlining. The metalanguage was developed for the original COBOL specifications.

Elements of COBOL's metalanguage
Element	Appearance	Function
All capitals	EXAMPLE	Reserved word
Underlining	EXAMPLE	The reserved word is compulsory
Braces	{ }	Only one option may be selected
Brackets	[]	Zero or one options may be selected
Ellipsis	...	The preceding element may be repeated
Bars	{| |}	One or more options may be selected. Any option may only be selected once.
Bars	[| |]	Zero or more options may be selected. Any option may only be selected once.

As an example, consider the following description of an ADD statement:

 𝙰𝙳𝙳_{identifier-1literal-1}…𝚃𝙾_{identifier-2[𝚁𝙾𝚄𝙽𝙳𝙴𝙳_]}…[|𝙾𝙽𝚂𝙸𝚉𝙴_𝙴𝚁𝚁𝙾𝚁_imperative-statement-1𝙽𝙾𝚃_𝙾𝙽𝚂𝙸𝚉𝙴_𝙴𝚁𝚁𝙾𝚁_imperative-statement-2|][𝙴𝙽𝙳-𝙰𝙳𝙳_]

This description permits the following variants:

ADD 1 TO x
ADD 1, a, b TO x ROUNDED, y, z ROUNDED

ADD a, b TO c
    ON SIZE ERROR
        DISPLAY "Error"
END-ADD

ADD a TO b
    NOT SIZE ERROR
        DISPLAY "No error"
    ON SIZE ERROR
        DISPLAY "Error"

=== Code format ===
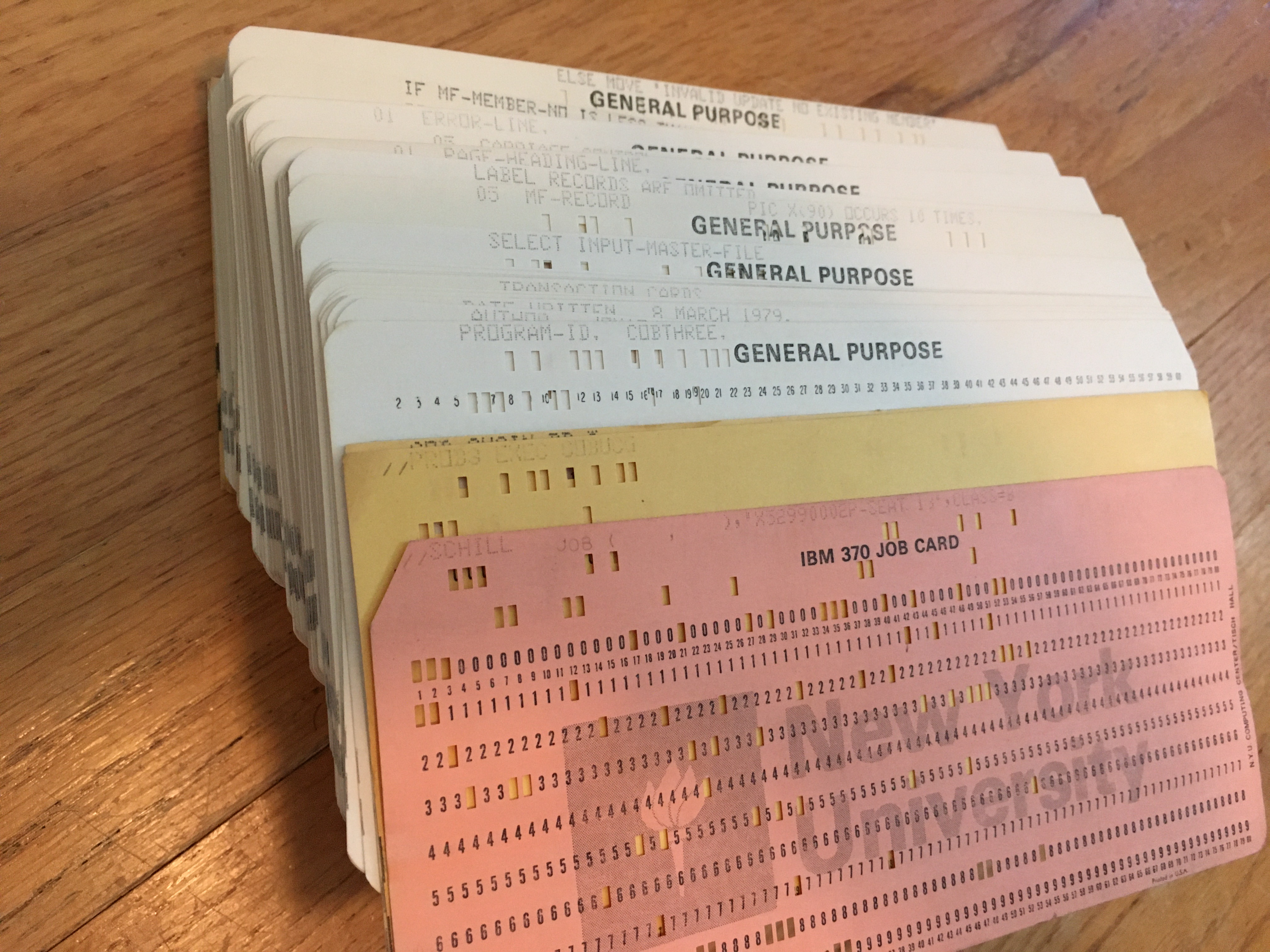
COBOL program deck of punched cards, from the 1970s

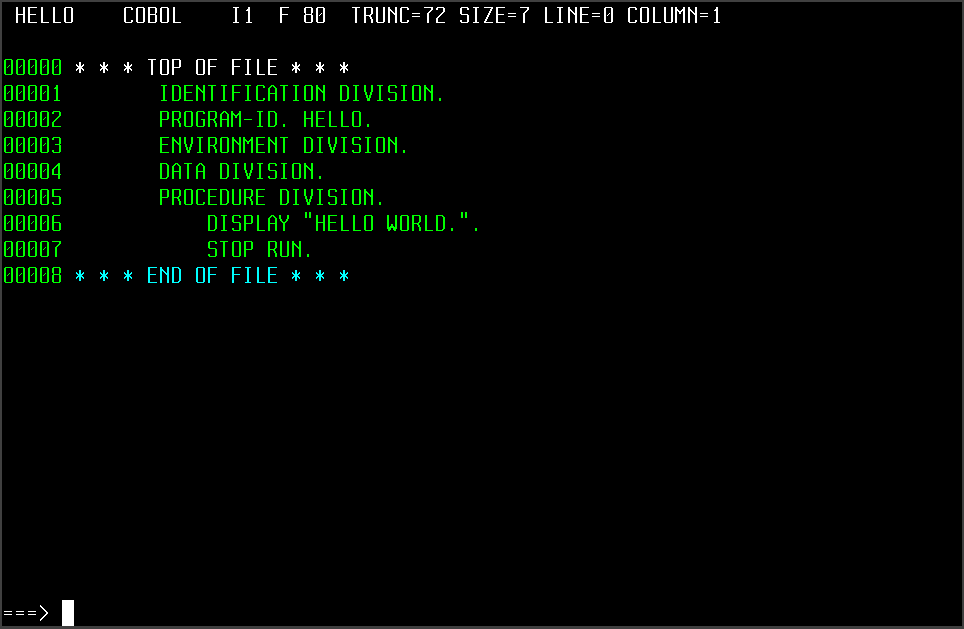
3270 session

The height of COBOL's popularity coincided with the era of keypunch machines and punched cards. The program itself was written onto punched cards, then read in and compiled, and the data fed into the program was sometimes on cards as well.

COBOL can be written in two formats: fixed (the default) or free. In fixed-format, code must be aligned to fit in certain areas (a holdover from using punched cards). Until COBOL 2002, these were:

Name	Column(s)	Usage
Sequence number area	1–6	Originally used for card/line numbers (facilitating mechanical punched card sorting to assure intended program code sequence after manual editing/handling), this area is ignored by the compiler
Indicator area	7	The following characters are allowed here: * – Comment line; / – Comment line that will be printed on a new page of a source listing; - – Continuation line, where words or literals from the previous line are continued; D – Line enabled in debugging mode, which is otherwise ignored
Area A	8–11	This contains: DIVISION, SECTION and procedure headers; 01 and 77 level numbers and file/report descriptors
Area B	12–72	Any other code not allowed in Area A
Program name area	73–	Historically up to column 80 for punched cards, it is used to identify the program or sequence the card belongs to

In COBOL 2002, Areas A and B were merged to form the program-text area, which now ends at an implementor-defined column.

COBOL 2002 also introduced free-format code. Free-format code can be placed in any column of the file, as in newer programming languages. Comments are specified using *>, which can be placed anywhere and can also be used in fixed-format source code. Continuation lines are not present, and the >>PAGE directive replaces the / indicator.

=== Identification division ===
The identification division identifies the following code entity and contains the definition of a class or interface.

==== Object-oriented programming ====
Classes and interfaces have been in COBOL since 2002. Classes have factory objects, containing class methods and variables, and instance objects, containing instance methods and variables. Inheritance and interfaces provide polymorphism. Support for generic programming is provided through parameterized classes, which can be instantiated to use any class or interface. Objects are stored as references, which may be restricted to a certain type. There are two ways of calling a method: the INVOKE statement, which acts similarly to CALL, or through inline method invocation, which is analogous to using functions.

*> These are equivalent.
INVOKE my-class "foo" RETURNING var
MOVE my-class::"foo" TO var *> Inline method invocation

COBOL does not provide a way to hide methods. Class data can be hidden, however, by declaring it without a PROPERTY clause, which leaves external code no way to access it. Method overloading was added in COBOL 2014.

=== Environment division ===
The environment division contains the configuration section and the input-output section. The configuration section is used to specify variable features such as currency signs, locales and character sets. The input-output section contains file-related information.

==== Files ====
COBOL supports three file formats, or organizations: sequential, indexed and relative. In sequential files, records are contiguous and must be traversed sequentially, similarly to a linked list. Indexed files have one or more indexes which allow records to be randomly accessed and which can be sorted on them. Each record must have a unique key, but other, alternate, record keys need not be unique. Implementations of indexed files vary between vendors, although common implementations, such as C-ISAM and VSAM, are based on IBM's ISAM. Other implementations are Record Management Services on OpenVMS and Enscribe on HPE NonStop (Tandem). Relative files, like indexed files, have a unique record key, but they do not have alternate keys. A relative record's key is its ordinal position; for example, the 10th record has a key of 10. This means that creating a record with a key of 5 may require the creation of (empty) preceding records. Relative files also allow for both sequential and random access.

A common non-standard extension is the line sequential organization, used to process text files. Records in a file are terminated by a newline and may be of varying length.

=== Data division ===
The data division is split into six sections which declare different items: the file section, for file records; the working-storage section, for static variables; the local-storage section, for automatic variables; the linkage section, for parameters and the return value; the report section and the screen section, for text-based user interfaces.

==== Aggregated data ====
Data items in COBOL are declared hierarchically through the use of level-numbers, which indicate if a data item is part of another. An item with a higher level-number is subordinate to an item with a lower one. Top-level data items, with a level-number of 1, are called records. Items that have subordinate aggregate data are called group items; those that do not are called elementary items. Level-numbers used to describe standard data items are between 1 and 49.

       01  some-record.                   *> Aggregate group record item
           05  num            PIC 9(10).  *> Elementary item
           05  the-date.                  *> Aggregate (sub)group record item
               10  the-year   PIC 9(4).   *> Elementary item
               10  the-month  PIC 99.     *> Elementary item
               10  the-day    PIC 99.     *> Elementary item

In the above example, elementary item num and group item the-date are subordinate to the record some-record, while elementary items the-year, the-month, and the-day are part of the group item the-date.

Subordinate items can be disambiguated with the IN (or OF) keyword. For example, consider the example code above along with the following example:

       01  sale-date.
           05  the-year       PIC 9(4).
           05  the-month      PIC 99.
           05  the-day        PIC 99.

The names the-year, the-month, and the-day are ambiguous by themselves, since more than one data item is defined with those names. To specify a particular data item, for instance one of the items contained within the sale-date group, the programmer would use the-year IN sale-date (or the equivalent the-year OF sale-date). This syntax is similar to the "dot notation" supported by most contemporary languages.

==== Other data levels ====
A level-number of 66 is used to declare a re-grouping of previously defined items, irrespective of how those items are structured. This data level, also referred to by the associated RENAMES clause, is rarely used and, circa 1988, was usually found in old programs. Its ability to ignore the hierarchical and logical structure data meant its use was not recommended and many installations forbade its use.

       01  customer-record.
           05  cust-key            PIC X(10).
           05  cust-name.
               10  cust-first-name PIC X(30).
               10  cust-last-name  PIC X(30).
           05  cust-dob            PIC 9(8).
           05  cust-balance        PIC 9(7)V99.
           
       66  cust-personal-details   RENAMES cust-name THRU cust-dob.
       66  cust-all-details        RENAMES cust-name THRU cust-balance.

A 77 level-number indicates the item is stand-alone, and in such situations is equivalent to the level-number 01. For example, the following code declares two 77-level data items, property-name and sales-region, which are non-group data items that are independent of (not subordinate to) any other data items:

       77  property-name      PIC X(80).
       77  sales-region       PIC 9(5).

An 88 level-number declares a condition name (a so-called 88-level) which is true when its parent data item contains one of the values specified in its VALUE clause. For example, the following code defines two 88-level condition-name items that are true or false depending on the current character data value of the wage-type data item. When the data item contains a value of 'H', the condition-name wage-is-hourly is true, whereas when it contains a value of 'S' or 'Y', the condition-name wage-is-yearly is true. If the data item contains some other value, both of the condition-names are false.

       01  wage-type          PIC X.
           88  wage-is-hourly VALUE "H".
           88  wage-is-yearly VALUE "S", "Y".

==== Data types ====
Standard COBOL provides the following data types:

Data type	Sample declaration	Notes
Alphabetic	PIC A(30)	May contain only letters or spaces.
Alphanumeric	PIC X(30)	May contain any characters.
Boolean	PIC 1 USAGE BIT	Data stored in the form of 0s and 1s, as a binary number.
Index	USAGE INDEX	Used to reference table elements.
National	PIC N(30)	Similar to alphanumeric, but using an extended character set, e.g. UTF-8.
Numeric	PIC 9(5)V9(2)	Contains exactly 7 digits (7=5+2). 'V' locates the implicit decimal in a fixed-point number.
Object	USAGE OBJECT REFERENCE	May reference either an object or NULL.
Pointer	USAGE POINTER	

Type safety is variable in COBOL. Numeric data is converted between different representations and sizes silently and alphanumeric data can be placed in any data item that can be stored as a string, including numeric and group data. In contrast, object references and pointers may only be assigned from items of the same type and their values may be restricted to a certain type.

==== PICTURE clause ====
A PICTURE (or PIC) clause is a string of characters, each of which represents a portion of the data item and what it may contain. Some picture characters specify the type of the item and how many characters or digits it occupies in memory. For example, a 9 indicates a decimal digit, and an S indicates that the item is signed. Other picture characters (called insertion and editing characters) specify how an item should be formatted. For example, a series of + characters define character positions as well as how a leading sign character is to be positioned within the final character data; the rightmost non-numeric character will contain the item's sign, while other character positions corresponding to a + to the left of this position will contain a space. Repeated characters can be specified more concisely by specifying a number in parentheses after a picture character; for example, 9(7) is equivalent to 9999999. Picture specifications containing only digit (9) and sign (S) characters define purely numeric data items, while picture specifications containing alphabetic (A) or alphanumeric (X) characters define alphanumeric data items. The presence of other formatting characters define edited numeric or edited alphanumeric data items.

Examples
PICTURE clause	Value in	Value out
PIC 9(5)	100	00100
PIC 9(5)	"Hello"	"Hello" (this is legal, but results in undefined behavior)
PIC +++++	-10	" -10" (note leading spaces)
PIC 99/99/9(4)	30042003	"30/04/2003"
PIC *(4)9.99	100.50	"**100.50"
PIC *(4)9.99	0	"****0.00"
PIC X(3)BX(3)BX(3)	"ABCDEFGHI"	"ABC DEF GHI"

==== USAGE clause ====
The USAGE clause declares the format in which data is stored. Depending on the data type, it can either complement or be used instead of a PICTURE clause. While it can be used to declare pointers and object references, it is mostly geared towards specifying numeric types. These numeric formats are:

- Binary, where a minimum size is either specified by the PICTURE clause or by a USAGE clause such as BINARY-LONG
- USAGE COMPUTATIONAL, where data may be stored in whatever format the implementation provides; often equivalent to USAGE BINARY
- USAGE DISPLAY, the default format, where data is stored as a string
- Floating-point, in either an implementation-dependent format or according to IEEE 754
- USAGE NATIONAL, where data is stored as a string using an extended character set
- USAGE PACKED-DECIMAL, where data is stored in the smallest possible decimal format (typically packed binary-coded decimal)

==== Report writer ====
The report writer is a declarative facility for creating reports. The programmer need only specify the report layout and the data required to produce it, freeing them from having to write code to handle things like page breaks, data formatting, and headings and footings.

Reports are associated with report files, which are files that may only be written to through report writer statements.

       FD  report-out REPORT sales-report.

Each report is defined in the report section of the data division. A report is split into report groups which define the report's headings, footings and details. Reports work around hierarchical control breaks. Control breaks occur when a key variable changes it value; for example, when creating a report detailing customers' orders, a control break could occur when the program reaches a different customer's orders. Here is an example report description for a report that gives a salesperson's sales and which warns of any invalid records:

       RD  sales-report
           PAGE LIMITS 60 LINES
           FIRST DETAIL 3
           CONTROLS seller-name.

       01  TYPE PAGE HEADING.
           03  COL 1                    VALUE "Sales Report".
           03  COL 74                   VALUE "Page".
           03  COL 79                   PIC Z9 SOURCE PAGE-COUNTER.

       01  sales-on-day TYPE DETAIL, LINE + 1.
           03  COL 3                    VALUE "Sales on".
           03  COL 12                   PIC 99/99/9999 SOURCE sales-date.
           03  COL 21                   VALUE "were".
           03  COL 26                   PIC $$$$9.99 SOURCE sales-amount.

       01  invalid-sales TYPE DETAIL, LINE + 1.
           03  COL 3                    VALUE "INVALID RECORD:".
           03  COL 19                   PIC X(34) SOURCE sales-record.

       01  TYPE CONTROL HEADING seller-name, LINE + 2.
           03  COL 1                    VALUE "Seller:".
           03  COL 9                    PIC X(30) SOURCE seller-name.

The above report description describes the following layout:

Sales Report                                                             Page  1

Seller: Howard Bromberg
  Sales on 10/12/2008 were $1000.00
  Sales on 12/12/2008 were    $0.00
  Sales on 13/12/2008 were   $31.47
  INVALID RECORD: Howard Bromberg             XXXXYY

Seller: Howard Discount
...
Sales Report                                                            Page 12

  Sales on 08/05/2014 were  $543.98
  INVALID RECORD: William Selden      12052014FOOFOO
  Sales on 30/05/2014 were    $0.00

Four statements control the report writer: INITIATE, which prepares the report writer for printing; GENERATE, which prints a report group; SUPPRESS, which suppresses the printing of a report group; and TERMINATE, which terminates report processing. For the above sales report example, the procedure division might look like this:

           OPEN INPUT sales, OUTPUT report-out
           INITIATE sales-report
 
           PERFORM UNTIL 1 <> 1
               READ sales
                   AT END
                       EXIT PERFORM
               END-READ
 
               VALIDATE sales-record
               IF valid-record
                   GENERATE sales-on-day
               ELSE
                   GENERATE invalid-sales
               END-IF
           END-PERFORM
 
           TERMINATE sales-report
           CLOSE sales, report-out
           .

Use of the Report Writer facility tends to vary considerably; some organizations use it extensively and some not at all. In addition, implementations of Report Writer ranged in quality, with those at the lower end sometimes using excessive amounts of memory at runtime.

=== Procedure division ===
==== Procedures ====
The sections and paragraphs in the procedure division (collectively called procedures) can be used as labels and as simple subroutines. Unlike in other divisions, paragraphs do not need to be in sections.

Execution goes down through the procedures of a program until it is terminated. To use procedures as subroutines, the PERFORM verb is used.

A PERFORM statement somewhat resembles a procedure call in newer languages in the sense that execution returns to the code following the PERFORM statement at the end of the called code; however, it does not provide a mechanism for parameter passing or for returning a result value. If a subroutine is invoked using a simple statement like PERFORM subroutine, then control returns at the end of the called procedure. However, PERFORM is unusual in that it may be used to call a range spanning a sequence of several adjacent procedures. This is done with the PERFORM sub-1 THRU sub-n construct:

PROCEDURE so-and-so.
    PERFORM ALPHA
    PERFORM ALPHA THRU GAMMA
    STOP RUN.
ALPHA.
    DISPLAY 'A'.
BETA.
    DISPLAY 'B'.
GAMMA.
    DISPLAY 'C'.

The output of this program will be: "A A B C".

PERFORM also differs from conventional procedure calls in that there is, at least traditionally, no notion of a call stack. As a consequence, nested invocations are possible (a sequence of code being PERFORMed may execute a PERFORM statement itself), but require extra care if parts of the same code are executed by both invocations. The problem arises when the code in the inner invocation reaches the exit point of the outer invocation. More formally, if control passes through the exit point of a PERFORM invocation that was called earlier but has not yet completed, the COBOL 2002 standard stipulates that the behavior is undefined.

The reason is that COBOL, rather than a "return address", operates with what may be called a continuation address. When control flow reaches the end of any procedure, the continuation address is looked up and control is transferred to that address. Before the program runs, the continuation address for every procedure is initialized to the start address of the procedure that comes next in the program text so that, if no PERFORM statements happen, control flows from top to bottom through the program. But when a PERFORM statement executes, it modifies the continuation address of the called procedure (or the last procedure of the called range, if PERFORM THRU was used), so that control will return to the call site at the end. The original value is saved and is restored afterwards, but there is only one storage position. If two nested invocations operate on overlapping code, they may interfere which each other's management of the continuation address in several ways.

The following example (taken from Veerman & Verhoeven 2006) illustrates the problem:

LABEL1.
    DISPLAY '1'
    PERFORM LABEL2 THRU LABEL3
    STOP RUN.
LABEL2.
    DISPLAY '2'
    PERFORM LABEL3 THRU LABEL4.
LABEL3.
    DISPLAY '3'.
LABEL4.
    DISPLAY '4'.

One might expect that the output of this program would be "1 2 3 4 3": After displaying "2", the second PERFORM causes "3" and "4" to be displayed, and then the first invocation continues on with "3". In traditional COBOL implementations, this is not the case. Rather, the first PERFORM statement sets the continuation address at the end of LABEL3 so that it will jump back to the call site inside LABEL1. The second PERFORM statement sets the return at the end of LABEL4 but does not modify the continuation address of LABEL3, expecting it to be the default continuation. Thus, when the inner invocation arrives at the end of LABEL3, it jumps back to the outer PERFORM statement, and the program stops having printed just "1 2 3". On the other hand, in some COBOL implementations like the open-source TinyCOBOL compiler, the two PERFORM statements do not interfere with each other and the output is indeed "1 2 3 4 3". Therefore, the behavior in such cases is not only (perhaps) surprising, it is also not portable.

A special consequence of this limitation is that PERFORM cannot be used to write recursive code. To write recursive routines, one must use a nested subprogram. Another simple example to illustrate this (slightly simplified from Veerman & Verhoeven 2006):

    MOVE 1 TO A
    PERFORM LABEL
    STOP RUN.
LABEL.
    DISPLAY A
    IF A < 3
        ADD 1 TO A
        PERFORM LABEL
    END-IF
    DISPLAY 'END'.

One might expect that the output is "1 2 3 END END END", and in fact that is what some COBOL compilers will produce. But other compilers, like IBM COBOL, will produce code that prints "1 2 3 END END END END ..." and so on, printing "END" over and over in an endless loop. Since there is limited space to store backup continuation addresses, the backups get overwritten in the course of recursive invocations, and all that can be restored is the jump back to DISPLAY 'END'.

==== Statements ====
COBOL 2014 has 47 statements (also called verbs), which can be grouped into the following broad categories: control flow, I/O, data manipulation and the report writer. The report writer statements are covered in the report writer section.

==== Control flow ====
COBOL's conditional statements are IF and EVALUATE. EVALUATE is a switch-like statement with the added capability of evaluating multiple values and conditions. This can be used to implement decision tables. For example, the following might be used to control a CNC lathe:

EVALUATE TRUE ALSO desired-speed ALSO current-speed
    WHEN lid-closed ALSO min-speed THRU max-speed ALSO LESS THAN desired-speed
        PERFORM speed-up-machine
    WHEN lid-closed ALSO min-speed THRU max-speed ALSO GREATER THAN desired-speed
        PERFORM slow-down-machine
    WHEN lid-open ALSO ANY ALSO NOT ZERO
        PERFORM emergency-stop
    WHEN OTHER
        CONTINUE
END-EVALUATE

The PERFORM statement is used to define loops which are executed until a condition is true (not while true, which is more common in other languages). It is also used to call procedures or ranges of procedures (see the procedures section for more details). CALL and INVOKE call subprograms and methods, respectively. The name of the subprogram/method is contained in a string which may be a literal or a data item. Parameters can be passed by reference, by content (where a copy is passed by reference) or by value (but only if a prototype is available). CANCEL unloads subprograms from memory. GO TO causes the program to jump to a specified procedure.

The GOBACK statement is a return statement and the STOP statement stops the program. The EXIT statement has six different formats: it can be used as a return statement, a break statement, a continue statement, an end marker or to leave a procedure.

Exceptions are raised by a RAISE statement and caught with a handler, or declarative, defined in the DECLARATIVES portion of the procedure division. Declaratives are sections beginning with a USE statement which specify the errors to handle. Exceptions can be names or objects. RESUME is used in a declarative to jump to the statement after the one that raised the exception or to a procedure outside the DECLARATIVES. Unlike other languages, uncaught exceptions may not terminate the program and the program can proceed unaffected.

==== I/O ====
File I/O is handled by the self-describing OPEN, CLOSE, READ, and WRITE statements along with a further three: REWRITE, which updates a record; START, which selects subsequent records to access by finding a record with a certain key; and UNLOCK, which releases a lock on the last record accessed.

User interaction is done using ACCEPT and DISPLAY.

==== Data manipulation ====
The following verbs manipulate data:

- INITIALIZE, which sets data items to their default values.
- MOVE, which assigns values to data items ; MOVE CORRESPONDING assigns corresponding like-named fields.
- SET, which has 15 formats: it can modify indices, assign object references and alter table capacities, among other functions.
- ADD, SUBTRACT, MULTIPLY, DIVIDE, and COMPUTE, which handle arithmetic (with COMPUTE assigning the result of a formula to a variable).
- ALLOCATE and FREE, which handle dynamic memory.
- VALIDATE, which validates and distributes data as specified in an item's description in the data division.
- STRING and UNSTRING, which concatenate and split strings, respectively.
- INSPECT, which tallies or replaces instances of specified substrings within a string.
- SEARCH, which searches a table for the first entry satisfying a condition.

Files and tables are sorted using SORT and the MERGE verb merges and sorts files. The RELEASE verb provides records to sort and RETURN retrieves sorted records in order.

==== Scope termination ====
Some statements, such as IF and READ, may themselves contain statements. Such statements may be terminated in two ways: by a period (implicit termination), which terminates all unterminated statements contained, or by a scope terminator, which terminates the nearest matching open statement.

*> Terminator period ("implicit termination")
IF invalid-record
    IF no-more-records
        NEXT SENTENCE
    ELSE
        READ record-file
            AT END SET no-more-records TO TRUE.

*> Scope terminators ("explicit termination")
IF invalid-record
    IF no-more-records
        CONTINUE
    ELSE
        READ record-file
            AT END SET no-more-records TO TRUE
        END-READ
    END-IF
END-IF

Nested statements terminated with a period are a common source of bugs. For example, examine the following code:

IF x
    DISPLAY y.
    DISPLAY z.

Here, the intent is to display y and z if condition x is true. However, z will be displayed whatever the value of x because the IF statement is terminated by an erroneous period after DISPLAY y.

Another bug is a result of the dangling else problem, when two IF statements can associate with an ELSE.

IF x
    IF y
        DISPLAY a
ELSE
    DISPLAY b.

In the above fragment, the ELSE associates with the IF y statement instead of the IF x statement, causing a bug. Prior to the introduction of explicit scope terminators, preventing it would require ELSE NEXT SENTENCE to be placed after the inner IF.

==== Self-modifying code ====
The original (1960) COBOL specification supported the infamous ALTER X TO PROCEED TO Y statement, for which many compilers generated self-modifying code. X and Y are procedure labels, and the single GO TO statement in procedure X executed after such an ALTER statement means GO TO Y instead. Many compilers still support it, but it was deemed obsolete in the COBOL 1985 standard and deleted in 2002.

The ALTER statement was poorly regarded because it undermined "locality of context" and made a program's overall logic difficult to comprehend. As textbook author Daniel D. McCracken wrote in 1976, when "someone who has never seen the program before must become familiar with it as quickly as possible, sometimes under critical time pressure because the program has failed ... the sight of a GO TO statement in a paragraph by itself, signaling as it does the existence of an unknown number of ALTER statements at unknown locations throughout the program, strikes fear in the heart of the bravest programmer."

=== Hello, world ===
A "Hello, World!" program in COBOL:

       IDENTIFICATION DIVISION.
       PROGRAM-ID. hello-world.
       PROCEDURE DIVISION.
           DISPLAY "Hello, world!"
           .

When the now famous "Hello, World!" program example in The C Programming Language was first published in 1978 a similar mainframe COBOL program sample would have been submitted through JCL, very likely using a punch card reader, and 80 column punch cards. The listing below, with an empty DATA DIVISION, was tested using Linux and the System/370 Hercules emulator running MVS 3.8J. The JCL, written in July 2015, is derived from the Hercules tutorials and samples hosted by Jay Moseley. In keeping with COBOL programming of that era, HELLO, WORLD is displayed in all capital letters.

//COBUCLG  JOB (001),'COBOL BASE TEST',                                
//             CLASS=A,MSGCLASS=A,MSGLEVEL=(1,1)                       
//BASETEST EXEC COBUCLG                                                
//COB.SYSIN DD *                                                       
 00000* VALIDATION OF BASE COBOL INSTALL                               
 01000 IDENTIFICATION DIVISION.                                        
 01100 PROGRAM-ID. 'HELLO'.                                            
 02000 ENVIRONMENT DIVISION.                                           
 02100 CONFIGURATION SECTION.                                          
 02110 SOURCE-COMPUTER.  GNULINUX.                                     
 02120 OBJECT-COMPUTER.  HERCULES.                                     
 02200 SPECIAL-NAMES.                                                  
 02210     CONSOLE IS CONSL.                                           
 03000 DATA DIVISION.                                                  
 04000 PROCEDURE DIVISION.                                             
 04100 00-MAIN.                                                        
 04110     DISPLAY 'HELLO, WORLD' UPON CONSL.                          
 04900     STOP RUN.                                                   
//LKED.SYSLIB DD DSNAME=SYS1.COBLIB,DISP=SHR                           
//            DD DSNAME=SYS1.LINKLIB,DISP=SHR                          
//GO.SYSPRINT DD SYSOUT=A                                              
//

After submitting the JCL, the MVS console displayed:

    19.52.48 JOB    3  $HASP100 COBUCLG  ON READER1     COBOL BASE TEST
    19.52.48 JOB    3  IEF677I WARNING MESSAGE(S) FOR JOB COBUCLG  ISSUED
    19.52.48 JOB    3  $HASP373 COBUCLG  STARTED - INIT 1 - CLASS A - SYS BSP1
    19.52.48 JOB    3  IEC130I SYSPUNCH DD STATEMENT MISSING
    19.52.48 JOB    3  IEC130I SYSLIB   DD STATEMENT MISSING
    19.52.48 JOB    3  IEC130I SYSPUNCH DD STATEMENT MISSING
    19.52.48 JOB    3  IEFACTRT - Stepname  Procstep  Program   Retcode
    19.52.48 JOB    3  COBUCLG    BASETEST  COB       IKFCBL00  RC= 0000
    19.52.48 JOB    3  COBUCLG    BASETEST  LKED      IEWL      RC= 0000
    19.52.48 JOB    3  +HELLO, WORLD
    19.52.48 JOB    3  COBUCLG    BASETEST  GO        PGM=*.DD  RC= 0000
    19.52.48 JOB    3  $HASP395 COBUCLG  ENDED

Line 10 of the console listing above is highlighted for effect; the highlighting is not part of the actual console output.

The associated compiler listing generated over four pages of technical detail and job run information, for the single line of output from the 14 lines of COBOL.

== Reception ==
=== Lack of structure ===
In the 1970s, adoption of the structured programming paradigm was becoming increasingly widespread. Edsger Dijkstra, a preeminent computer scientist, wrote a letter to the editor of Communications of the ACM, published in 1975 entitled "How do we tell truths that might hurt?", in which he was critical of COBOL and several other contemporary languages, remarking that "the use of COBOL cripples the mind".

In a published dissent to Dijkstra's remarks, the computer scientist Howard E. Tompkins claimed that unstructured COBOL tended to be "written by programmers that have never had the benefit of structured COBOL taught well", arguing that the issue was primarily one of training.

One cause of spaghetti code was the GO TO statement. Attempts to remove GO TOs from COBOL code, however, resulted in convoluted programs and reduced code quality. GO TOs were largely replaced by the PERFORM statement and procedures, which promoted modular programming and gave easy access to powerful looping facilities. However, PERFORM could be used only with procedures so loop bodies were not located where they were used, making programs harder to understand. Since the adoption of the 1985 standard, the need for GO TO has been completely obviated by rich features of the PERFORM verb; however, GO TO remains for backwards compatibility, as it does in many other languages.

COBOL programs were infamous for being monolithic and lacking modularization. COBOL code could be modularized only through procedures, which were found to be inadequate for large systems. Otherwise, it was required to CALL separately compiled programs for modularity. It was impossible to restrict access to data until the COBOL-85 standard, meaning a procedure could access and modify any data item. Furthermore, there was no way to pass parameters to a procedure, an omission Jean Sammet regarded as the committee's biggest mistake. This problem was removed in the COBOL-85 standard with the introduction of the nested subprogram, which allowed for modularity and locally isolated data items.

Another complication stemmed from the ability to PERFORM THRU a specified sequence of procedures. This meant that control could jump to and return from any procedure, creating convoluted control flow and permitting a programmer to break the single-entry single-exit rule.

This situation improved as COBOL adopted more features. COBOL-74 added subprograms, giving programmers the ability to control the data each part of the program could access. COBOL-85 then added nested subprograms, allowing programmers to hide subprograms. Further control over data and code came in 2002 when object-oriented programming, user-defined functions and user-defined data types were included.

Nevertheless, much important legacy COBOL software uses unstructured code, which has become practically unmaintainable. It can be too risky and costly to modify even a simple section of code, since it may be used from unknown places in unknown ways.

=== Compatibility issues ===
COBOL was intended to be a highly portable, "common" language. However, by 2001, around 300 dialects had been created. One source of dialects was the standard itself: the 1974 standard was composed of one mandatory nucleus and eleven functional modules, each containing two or three levels of support. This permitted 104,976 possible variants.

COBOL-85 was not fully compatible with earlier versions, and its development was controversial. Joseph T. Brophy, the CIO of Travelers Insurance, spearheaded an effort to inform COBOL users of the high reprogramming costs of implementing the new standard. As a result, the ANSI COBOL Committee received more than 2,200 letters from the public, mostly negative, requiring the committee to make changes. On the other hand, conversion to COBOL-85 was thought to increase productivity in future years, thus justifying the conversion costs.

=== Verbose syntax ===
COBOL: /koh′bol/, n.

A weak, verbose, and flabby language used by code grinders to do boring mindless things on dinosaur mainframes. [...] Its very name is seldom uttered without ritual expressions of disgust or horror.

— The Jargon File 4.4.8.

COBOL syntax has often been criticized for its verbosity. Proponents say that this was intended to make the code self-documenting, easing program maintenance. COBOL was also intended to be easy for programmers to learn and use, while still being readable to non-technical staff such as managers.

The desire for readability led to the use of English-like syntax and structural elements, such as nouns, verbs, clauses, sentences, sections, and divisions. Yet by 1984, maintainers of COBOL programs were struggling to deal with "incomprehensible" code and the main changes in COBOL-85 were there to help ease maintenance.

Jean Sammet, a short-range committee member, noted that "little attempt was made to cater to the professional programmer, in fact people whose main interest is programming tend to be very unhappy with COBOL" which she attributed to COBOL's verbose syntax.

The academic world tends to regard COBOL as verbose, clumsy and inelegant, and tries to ignore it, although there are probably more COBOL programs and programmers in the world than there are for FORTRAN, ALGOL and PL/I combined. For the most part, only schools with an immediate vocational objective provide instruction in COBOL.

— Richard Conway and David Gries, 1973

Later, COBOL suffered from a shortage of material covering it; it took until 1963 for introductory books to appear (with Richard D. Irwin publishing a college textbook on COBOL in 1966). Donald Nelson, chair of the CODASYL COBOL committee, said in 1984 that "academics ... hate COBOL" and that computer science graduates "had 'hate COBOL' drilled into them".

By the mid-1980s, there was also significant condescension towards COBOL in the business community from users of other languages, for example FORTRAN or assembler, implying that COBOL could be used only for non-challenging problems.

In 2003, COBOL featured in 80% of information systems curricula in the United States, the same proportion as C++ and Java. Ten years later, a poll by Micro Focus found that 20% of university academics thought COBOL was outdated or dead and that 55% believed their students thought COBOL was outdated or dead. The same poll also found that only 25% of academics had COBOL programming on their curriculum even though 60% thought they should teach it.

=== Concerns about the design process ===
Doubts have been raised about the competence of the standards committee. Short-term committee member Howard Bromberg said that there was "little control" over the development process and that it was "plagued by discontinuity of personnel and ... a lack of talent." Jean Sammet and Jerome Garfunkel also noted that changes introduced in one revision of the standard would be reverted in the next, due as much to changes in who was in the standard committee as to objective evidence.

COBOL standards have repeatedly suffered from delays: COBOL-85 arrived five years later than hoped, COBOL 2002 was five years late, and COBOL 2014 was six years late. To combat delays, the standard committee allowed the creation of optional addenda which would add features more quickly than by waiting for the next standard revision. However, some committee members raised concerns about incompatibilities between implementations and frequent modifications of the standard.

=== Influences on other languages ===
COBOL's data structures influenced subsequent programming languages. Its record and file structure influenced PL/I and Pascal, and the REDEFINES clause was a predecessor to Pascal's variant records. Explicit file structure definitions preceded the development of database management systems and aggregated data was a significant advance over Fortran's arrays.

PICTURE data declarations were incorporated into PL/I, with minor changes.

COBOL's COPY facility, although considered "primitive", influenced the development of include directives.

The focus on portability and standardization meant programs written in COBOL could be portable and facilitated the spread of the language to a wide variety of hardware platforms and operating systems. Additionally, the well-defined division structure restricts the definition of external references to the Environment Division, which simplifies platform changes in particular.

== See also ==
- Alphabetical list of programming languages
- BLIS/COBOL
- CODASYL
- Comparison of programming languages
- Generational list of programming languages § COBOL based
- List of COBOL software and tools
