= ARITH-MATIC =

ARITH-MATIC is an extension of Grace Hopper's A-2 programming language, developed around 1955. ARITH-MATIC was originally known as A-3, but was renamed by the marketing department of Remington Rand UNIVAC.

== Some ARITH-MATIC subroutines ==
| Type | Subroutine | Description | Explanation |
|---|---|---|---|
| Arithmetic | AAO(A)(B)(C) | A+B=C | The A in the middle of 'AA0' stands for addition |
| Arithmetic | ASO(A)(B)(C) | A-B=C | The S in the middle of 'AS0' stands for subtraction |
| Arithmetic | AMO(A)(B)(C) | A*B=C | The M in the middle of 'AM0' stands for multiplication |
| Arithmetic | ADO(A)(B)(C) | A/B=C | The D in the middle of 'AD0' stands for division |
| Trigonometric | TSO(A)OOO(B) | Sin(A)=B | The S in the middle of 'TS0' stands for Sin |
| Trigonometric | TCO(A)OOO(B) | Cos(A)=B | The C in the middle of 'TC0' stands for Cos |
| Trigonometric | TTO(A)OOO(B) | Tan(A)=B | The T in the middle of 'TT0' stands for Tan |
| Trigonometric | TAT(A)OOO(B) | Arctan(A)=B | The AT stands for Arctan |
| Hyperbolic | HSO(A)OOO(B) | Sinh(A)=B | The S in the middle of 'HS0' stands for Sin h |
| Hyperbolic | HCO(A)OOO(B) | Cosh(A)=B | The C in the middle of 'HC0' stands for Cos h |
| Hyperbolic | HTO(A)OOO(B) | Tanh(A)=B | The T in the middle of 'HT0' stands for Tan h |
| General Mathematical | SQR(A)OOO(B) | Sqrt(A)=B | |
| General Mathematical | APN(A)(N)(B) | A**N=B | **: Exponentiation |

== See also ==
- A-0 System
