= MATH-MATIC =

Programming language for UNIVAC I and II

- Paradigm: imperative
- Designed by: Remington Rand
- First appeared: 1957
- Platform: UNIVAC I, UNIVAC II

Influenced by
- FLOW-MATIC

Influenced
- UNICODE (programming language)

MATH-MATIC is the marketing name for the AT-3 (Algebraic Translator 3) compiler, an early programming language for the UNIVAC I and UNIVAC II.

MATH-MATIC was written beginning around 1955 by a team led by Charles Katz under the direction of Grace Hopper. A preliminary manual was produced in 1957 and a final manual the following year.

Syntactically, MATH-MATIC was similar to Univac's contemporaneous business-oriented language, FLOW-MATIC, differing in providing algebraic-style expressions and floating-point arithmetic, and arrays rather than record structures.

== Notable features ==
Expressions in MATH-MATIC could contain numeric exponents, including decimals and fractions, by way of a custom typewriter.

MATH-MATIC programs could include inline assembler sections of ARITH-MATIC code and UNIVAC machine code.

The UNIVAC I had only 1000 words of memory, and the successor UNIVAC II as little as 2000. MATH-MATIC allowed for larger programs, automatically generating code to read overlay segments from UNISERVO tape as required. The compiler attempted to avoid splitting loops across segments.

== Influence ==
In proposing the collaboration with the ACM that led to ALGOL 58, the Gesellschaft für Angewandte Mathematik und Mechanik wrote that it considered MATH-MATIC the closest available language to its own proposal.

In contrast to Backus' FORTRAN, MATH-MATIC did not emphasise execution speed of compiled programs. The UNIVAC machines did not have floating-point hardware, and MATH-MATIC was translated via A-3 (ARITH-MATIC) pseudo-assembler code rather than directly to UNIVAC machine code, limiting its usefulness.

== Sample program ==
A sample MATH-MATIC program:

(2)  TYPE-IN ALPHA . 
(2A) READ A B C SERVO 4 STORAGE A IF SENTINEL JUMP TO SENTENCE 8 . 
(3)  READ D F SERVO 5 . 
(4)  VARY Y 1 (0.1) 3 SENTENCE 5 THRU 6 . 
(5)  X1 = (7*103*Y*A*SIN ALPHA)3 / (B POW D+C POW E) . 
(6)  WRITE AND EDIT A Y D E X1 SERVO 6 . 
(7)  JUMP TO SENTENCE 2A . 
(8)  CLOSE-INPUT AND REWIND SENTENCE 3 . 
(9)  CLOSE-OUTPUT SENTENCE 6 . 
(10) READ F G H N SERVO 4 STORAGE A IF SENTINEL JUMP TO SENTENCE 20 . 
(11) EXECUTE SENTENCE 3 . 
(12) X2 = (3 ROOT (E-G)+LOG (D+N)) / (F2.6*EXP H) . 
(13) WRITE EDIT F D F X2 SERVO 6 . 
(16) JUMP TO SENTENCE 10 . 
(20) STOP .
