= Bug (engineering) =

Defect in an engineered system

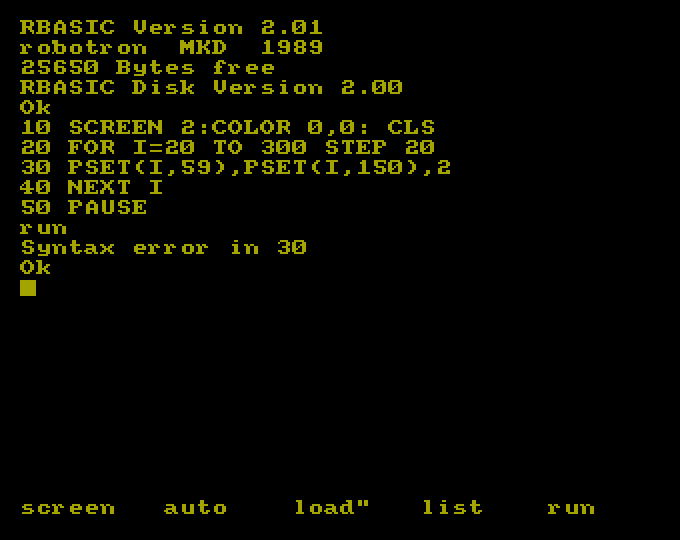
A BASIC program failing due to a syntax error in its code

In engineering, a bug is a design defect in an engineered system—such as software, computer hardware, electronics, circuitry, genome, or machinery—that causes an undesired result. Defects outside the scope of design, such as a server crash due to a natural disaster, are not bugs, nor do bugs occur in natural systems such as the weather.

Bug is a non-technical term; more formal terms, besides defect, are error, flaw, and fault. Bugs may be persistent, sporadic, intermittent, or transient; in computing, crashes, freezes, and glitches are types of bugs.

Since desirability is subjective, what is undesirable to one may be desirable to another, hence the often comical rejoinder occasionally offered to the report of a bug, "It's not a bug, it's a feature."

== History ==
The Middle English word bugge is the basis for the terms bugbear and bugaboo as terms used for a monster.

The term bug to describe a defect has been engineering jargon since at least as far back as the 1870s, long before electronic computers and computer software. For instance, Thomas Edison wrote the following words in a letter to an associate in 1878:

It has been just so in all of my inventions. The first step is an intuition, and comes with a burst, then difficulties arise—this thing gives out and [it is] then that "Bugs"—as such little faults and difficulties are called—show themselves and months of intense watching, study and labor are requisite before commercial success or failure is certainly reached.

In a comic strip printed in a 1924 telephone industry journal, a naive character hears that a man has a job as a "bug hunter" and gives a gift of a backscratcher. The man replies, "Don't you know that a 'bug hunter' is just a nickname for a repairman?"

Baffle Ball, the first mechanical pinball game, was advertised in 1931 with the slogan "No bugs in this game!"

Problems with military gear during World War II were referred to as bugs or glitches.

In the 1940 film Flight Command, a defect in a piece of direction-finding gear is called a bug.

In a book published in 1942, Louise Dickinson Rich, speaking of a powered ice-cutting machine, said, "Ice sawing was suspended until the creator could be brought in to take the bugs out of his darling."

Isaac Asimov used the term bug to refer to issues with a robot in his short story "Catch That Rabbit," published in 1944.

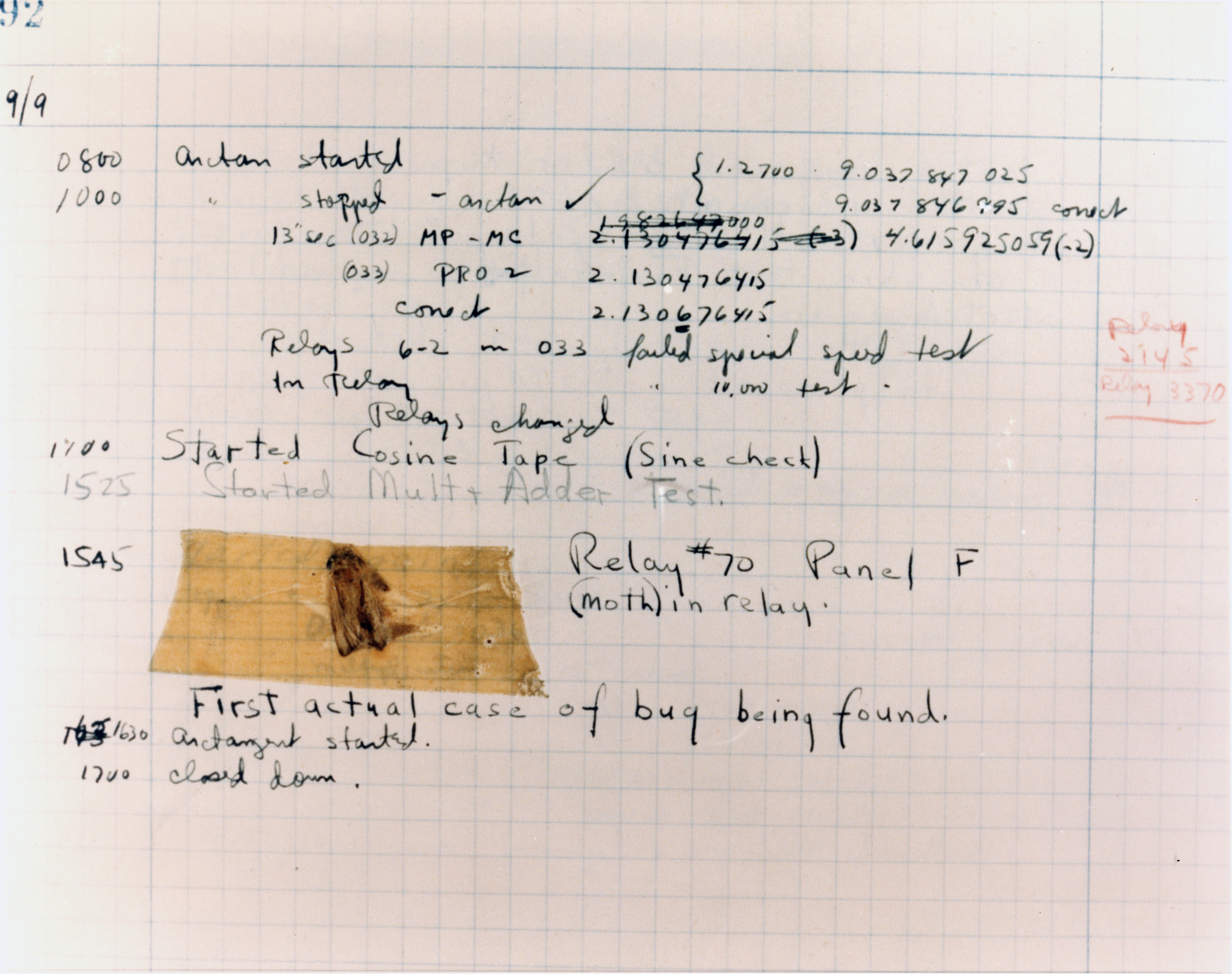
A page from the Harvard Mark II electromechanical computer's log, featuring a dead moth that was removed from the device

U.S. Navy Rear Adm. Grace Hopper, a computer pioneer, popularized a story about a moth that caused a problem in an early electromechanical computer. While Hopper was working on the Mark II and Mark III as Harvard faculty in about 1947, operators traced an error in the Mark II to a moth trapped in a relay. The moth was removed from the mechanism and taped in a log book with the note "First actual case of bug being found." Reportedly, the operators, including William "Bill" Burke, later of the Naval Weapons Laboratory, Dahlgren, Virginia, were familiar with the engineering term and probably making a pun by conflating the two meanings of bug (biological and technical). Even if a joke, the story indicates that the term was commonly used in the computer field at that time. The log book, complete with moth, is part of the collection of the Smithsonian National Museum of American History.

The related term debug also appears to predate its usage in computing: the Oxford English Dictionary's etymology of the word contains an attestation from 1945, in the context of aircraft engines.

== "It's not a bug, it's a feature" ==
Since bug implies undesirable behavior, calling out a bug is subjective. What some find a bug others may find a useful feature, hence the familiar phrase, "It's not a bug, it's a feature" (INABIAF). This quip is recorded in The Jargon File (1975) but dates at least to 1971, when the PDP-8 programmer Sandra Lee Harris of Digital Equipment Corporation (DEC) made the distinction between issues to be fixed in the code for DEC's FOCAL interpreter and those to be documented or clarified in the user manual.

Such behavior may be explicitly communicated to users or remain undocumented.
