= Richard Bloch (disambiguation) =

Richard Bloch (1926–2004) was an American entrepreneur and philanthropist, founder of H&R Block.

Richard Bloch may also refer to:

- Richard Milton Bloch (1921–2000), American computer programmer
- Richard L. Bloch (1929–2018), American businessman
