= Harvard Mark II =

Electromechanical computer at Harvard University, completed in 1947

- Also known as: Aiken Relay Calculator
- Developer: Howard Aiken, Edmund Berkeley, and Grace Hopper
- Released: 1947; 79 years ago
- Weight: 50,000 lb (23,000 kg)
- Predecessor: Harvard Mark I
- Successor: Harvard Mark III

The Harvard Mark II, also known as the Aiken Relay Calculator, was an electromechanical computer built under the direction of Howard Aiken at Harvard University, completed in 1947. It was financed by the United States Navy and used for ballistic calculations at Naval Proving Ground Dahlgren. Computer pioneers Edmund Berkeley and Grace Hopper worked together under Aiken to build and program the Mark II.

== Overview ==
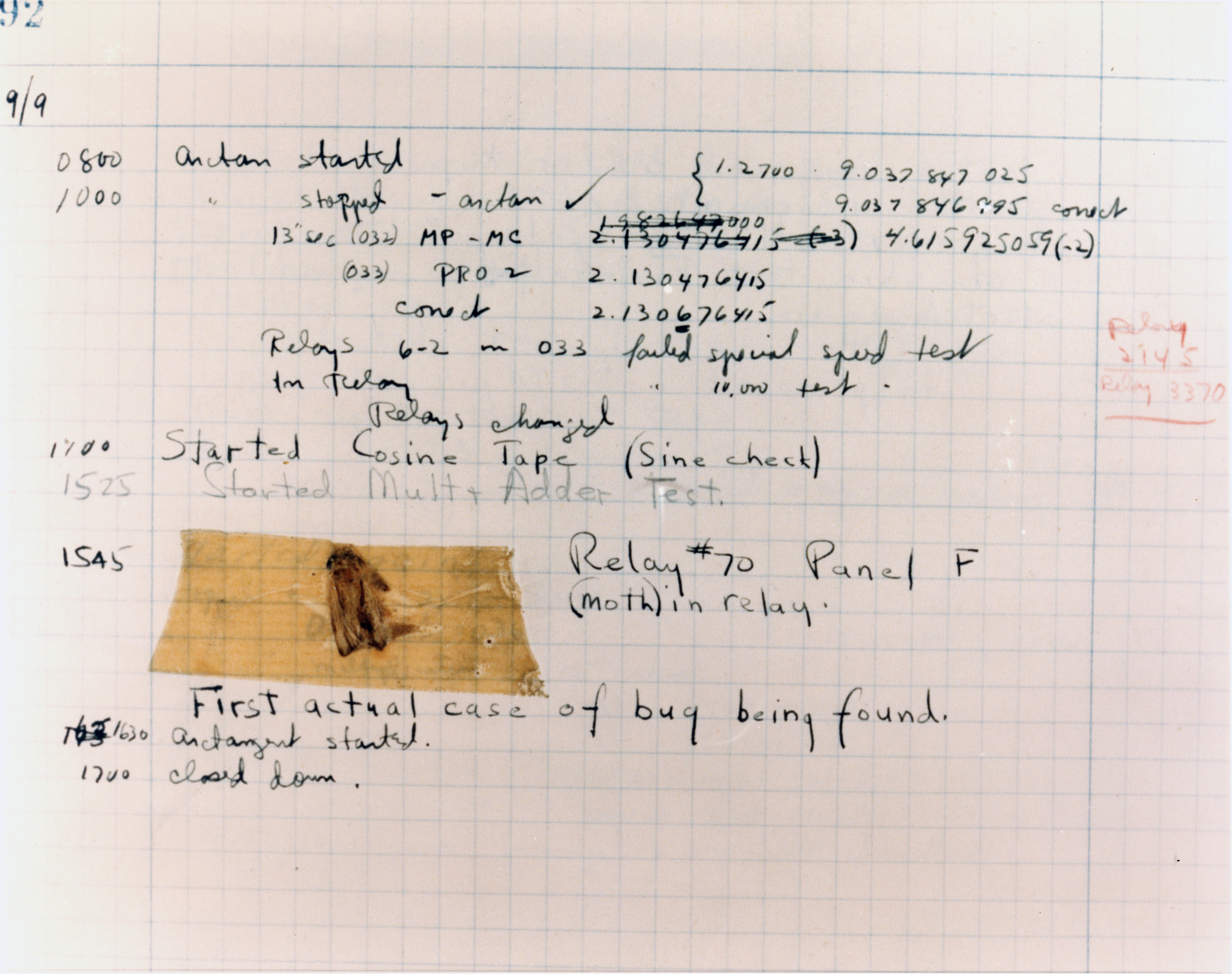
Logbook entry containing the "bug"

The contract to build the Mark II was signed with Harvard in February 1945, after the successful demonstration of the Mark I in 1944. It was completed and debugged in September 1947, and delivered to the US Navy Proving Ground at Dahlgren, Virginia in March 1948. Mark II became fully operational by the end of that year.

The Mark II was constructed with high-speed electromagnetic relays instead of the electro-mechanical counters used in the Mark I, making it much faster than its predecessor. It weighed 25 short tons (23 t) and occupied over 4,000 square feet (370 m^{2}) of floor space. Its addition time was 0.125 seconds (8 Hz) and the multiplication time was 0.750 seconds. This was a factor of 2.6 faster for addition and a factor of 8 faster for multiplication compared to the Mark I. It was the second machine (after the Bell Labs Relay Calculator) to have floating-point hardware. A unique feature of the Mark II is that it had built-in hardware for several functions such as the reciprocal, square root, logarithm, exponential, and some trigonometric functions. These took between five and twelve seconds to execute. Additionally, the Mark II was actually composed of two sub-computers that could either work in tandem or operate on separate functions, to cross-check results and debug malfunctions.

The Mark I and Mark II were not stored-program computers – they read instructions of the program one at a time from a tape and executed them. The Mark II had a peculiar programming method that was devised to ensure that the contents of a register were available when needed. The tape containing the program could encode only eight instructions, so what a particular instruction code meant depended on when it was executed. Each second was divided up into several periods, and a coded instruction could mean different things in different periods. An addition could be started in any of eight periods in the second, a multiplication could be started in any of four periods of the second, and a transfer of data could be started in any of twelve periods of the second. Although this system worked, it made the programming complicated, and it reduced the efficiency of the machine somewhat.

The Mark II is also known for being the computer with the first recorded instance of an actual bug (a moth) disrupting its operation. The insect was extracted from the machine's electronics and taped to the log book, with the note "first actual case of [a] bug being found", on September 9, 1947.

== See also ==
- Harvard Mark I
- Harvard Mark III
- Harvard Mark IV
- Bug (engineering)#History
