= Richard Milton Bloch =

American computer programmer (1921–2000)

Richard Milton Bloch (June 18, 1921 – May 22, 2000) was a pioneering American computer programmer. Bloch, Grace Hopper, and Robert Campbell were the first programmers of the Harvard Mark I, an electromechanical computer which, when it began operation in 1944, was the first American programmable computer.

== Early life ==
Bloch was born in Rochester, New York, on June 18, 1921, and grew up there, being graduated from Benjamin Franklin High School. He then attended Harvard University on a scholarship, majoring in mathematics, being graduated in 1943. He then immediately joined the Navy, as World War II was in progress, and was assigned to the Naval Research Institute. There, he was recruited by Howard Aiken to work on the Mark I project, moving to Harvard in March 1944.

== Mark I work ==
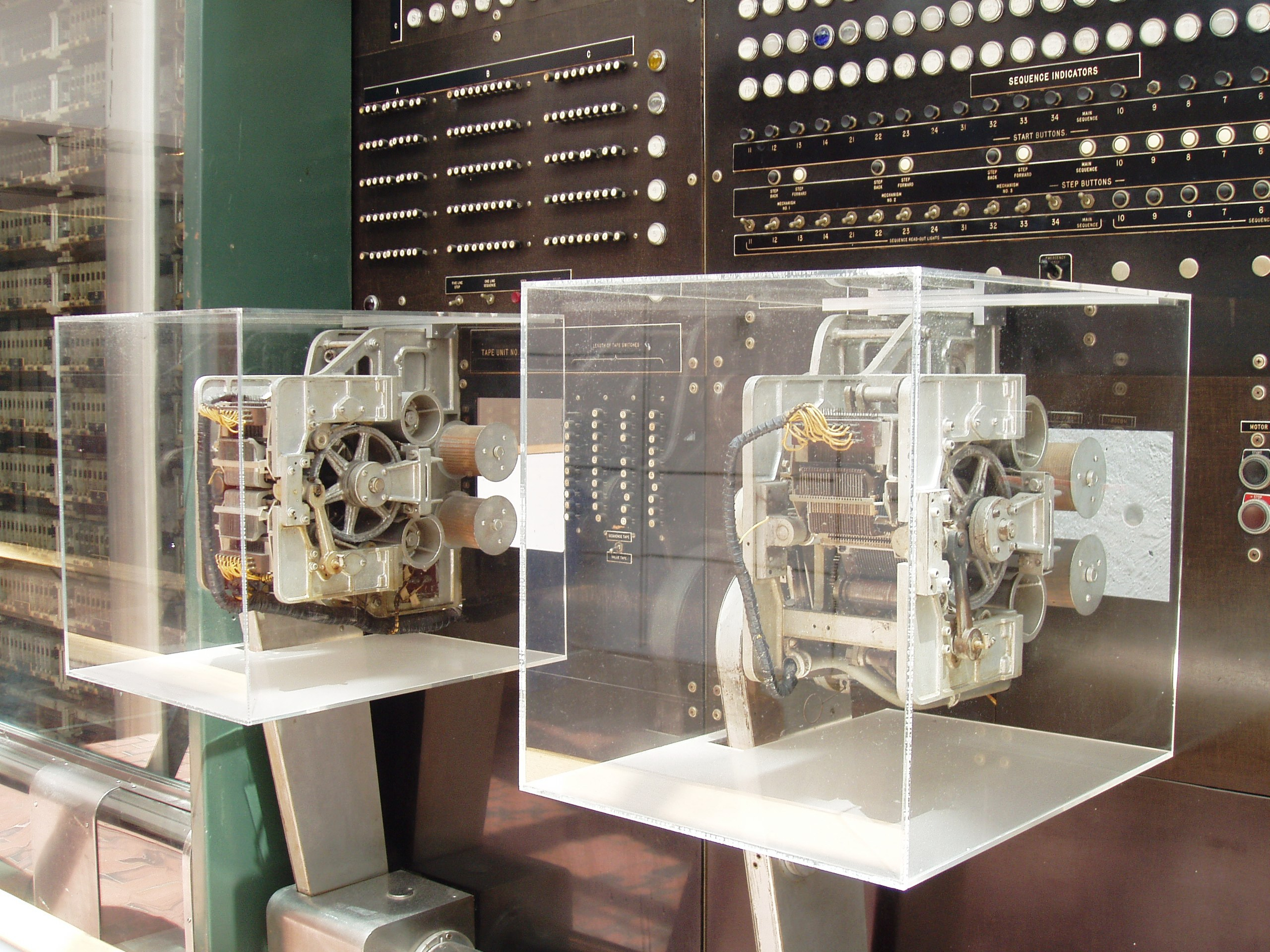
Mark I (detail)

The Harvard Mark I became operational in 1944, and was used for war work, including computation of ballistic tables, Bessel tables for electronics and other applications, and calculations used by the Manhattan Project for development of the atomic bomb.

Compilers and even assemblers had not yet been invented, so all programming was done in machine code punched into paper tape. Grace Hopper called Bloch the Mozart of the computer due to his ability to write a program in ink and have it run the first time. Robert Campbell called Bloch the primary force in getting the Mark I into productive operation.

Bloch and Campbell kept notebooks in which they wrote out pieces of code that had been checked out and were known to be correct. For instance, one of Bloch's routines computed sines for positive angles less than π/4 to 10 digits. Grace Hopper just copied Bloch's routine into her own program when needed, rather than using the (slow) sine unit built into the machine. This was an early step toward the creation of subroutines. Later, these subroutines were stored on separate paper tape rolls, although branching to one of these separate paper tapes and returning to the main program was done manually by human operators.

Robert Bloch, Robert Campbell, and, most famously, Grace Hopper developed some of the earliest instances of subroutines, branching techniques, code compression, and debugging procedures while at Harvard.

— Michael D. Smith, The Harvard Gazette

== Later career ==
Bloch left Harvard in 1947. He then worked for Raytheon on development of the RAYDAC, then became general manager of Raytheon's computer division, and later vice president for technical operations at Honeywell, vice president for corporate development at the Auerbach Corporation, vice president of the advanced systems division of General Electric, and chairman and chief executive of the Artificial Intelligence Corporation and the Meiko Scientific Corporation.

Bloch died of cancer on May 22, 2000.
