= Howard H. Aiken =

American physicist

Howard Hathaway Aiken
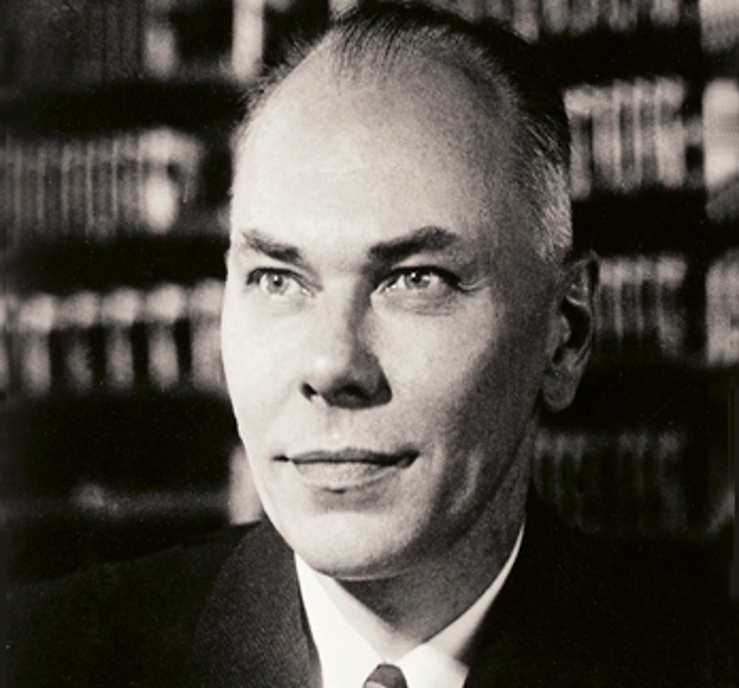
- Howard Aiken
- Born: March 8, 1900; Hoboken, New Jersey
- Died: March 14, 1973 (aged 73); St. Louis, Missouri
- Education: University of Wisconsin–Madison; Harvard University (doctorate)
- Known for: Automatic Sequence Controlled Calculators Harvard Mark I – IV
- Spouses: Louise Mancill (m. 1939–1942); Agnes Montgomery (m. 1943–1961); Mary McFarland (m. 1963)
- Awards: Harry H. Goode Memorial Award (1964); Edison Medal (1970)
- Scientific career
- Fields: Applied mathematics, computer science
- Workplaces: Harvard University, University of Miami
- Doctoral advisor: Emory Leon Chaffee
- Doctoral students: Gerrit Blaauw; Fred Brooks; Martin Greenberger; Kenneth E. Iverson; Anthony Oettinger; Gerard Salton

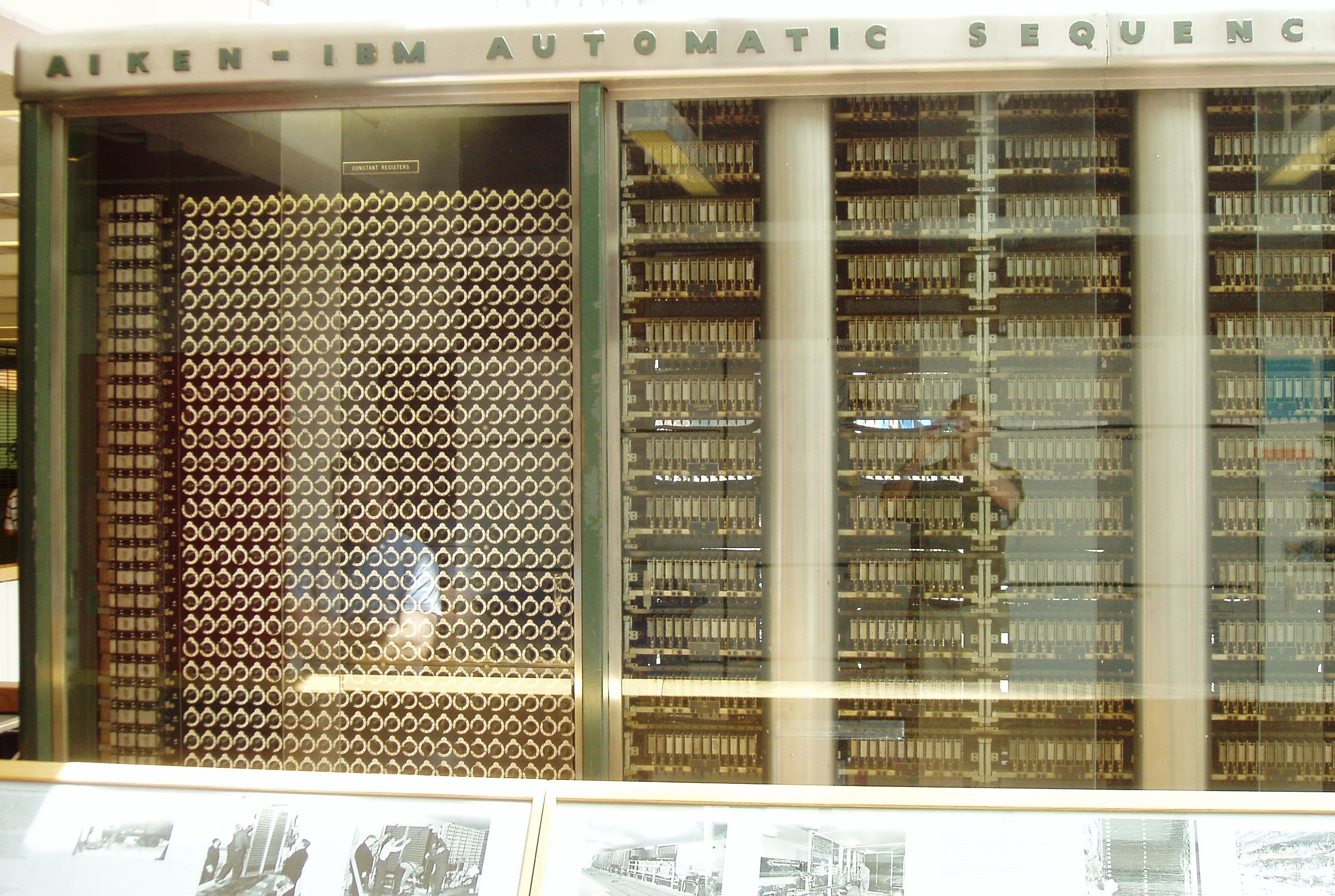
Harvard Mark I / IBM ASCC, left side.

Howard Hathaway Aiken (March 8, 1900 – March 14, 1973) was an American physicist and a pioneer in computing. He was the original conceptual designer behind IBM's Harvard Mark I, the United States' first programmable computer.

== Biography ==
Aiken was born on 8 March 1900, in Hoboken, New Jersey, to Daniel Aiken, who came from a wealthy and established Indiana family, and Margaret Emily Mierisch, whose parents were German immigrants. He grew up in Indianapolis where he graduated from Arsenal Technical High School in 1919. Aiken studied at the University of Wisconsin–Madison where he received his B.S. in electrical engineering in 1923. He later obtained his M.A. and Ph.D. degrees in physics from Harvard University in 1937 and 1939, respectively. While working on space-charge conduction in vacuum tubes during that time, he encountered differential equations that he could only solve numerically. Inspired by Charles Babbage's difference engine, he envisioned an electro-mechanical computing device that could do much of the tedious work for him. This computer was originally called the ASCC (Automatic Sequence Controlled Calculator) and later renamed Harvard Mark I. With engineering, construction, and funding from IBM, the machine was completed and installed at Harvard in February 1944. Richard Milton Bloch, Robert Campbell and Grace Hopper joined the project later as programmers. In 1947, Aiken completed his work on the Harvard Mark II computer. He continued his work on the Mark III and the Harvard Mark IV. The Mark III used some electronic components and the Mark IV was all-electronic. The Mark III and Mark IV used magnetic drum memory and the Mark IV also had magnetic-core memory.

Aiken accumulated honorary degrees at the University of Wisconsin, Wayne State University and Technische Hochschule, Darmstadt. He was elected a Fellow of the American Academy of Arts and Sciences in 1947. He received the University of Wisconsin–Madison College of Engineering Engineers Day Award in 1958, the Harry H. Goode Memorial Award in 1964, the Golden Plate Award of the American Academy of Achievement in 1965, the John Price Wetherill Medal in 1964, and the IEEE (Institute of Electrical and Electronics Engineers) Edison Medal in 1970 "For a meritorious career of pioneering contributions to the development and application of large-scale digital computers and important contributions to education in the digital computer field."

In addition to his work on the Mark series, another important contribution of Aiken's was the introduction of a master's program for computer science at Harvard in 1947, nearly a decade before the programs began to appear in other universities. This became a starting ground to future computer scientists, many of whom did doctoral dissertations under Aiken.

== Personal life ==
Howard Aiken married three times: to Louise Mancill in June 1937, then later to Agnes Montgomery, and lastly to Mary McFarland. He had two children; one with his first wife, and one with his second.

Howard Aiken was also a Commander in the United States Navy Reserve.

After he retired at age 60 to Fort Lauderdale, Florida, Aiken continued his contributions to technology. He founded Howard Aiken Industries Incorporated, which was a consulting firm that helped failing businesses recover. During his years in Florida, he joined the University of Miami as a Distinguished Professor of Information. In addition, Aiken became a consultant for companies such as Lockheed Martin and Monsanto. On the morning of March 14, 1973, Aiken died in his sleep during a consulting trip to St. Louis, Missouri. His widow, Mary, died in 2013.

== See also ==
- Aiken code
- List of pioneers in computer science
