= Grace Murray Hopper Park =

Park in Virginia, United States

Coordinates: 38°51′40″N 77°3′48″W

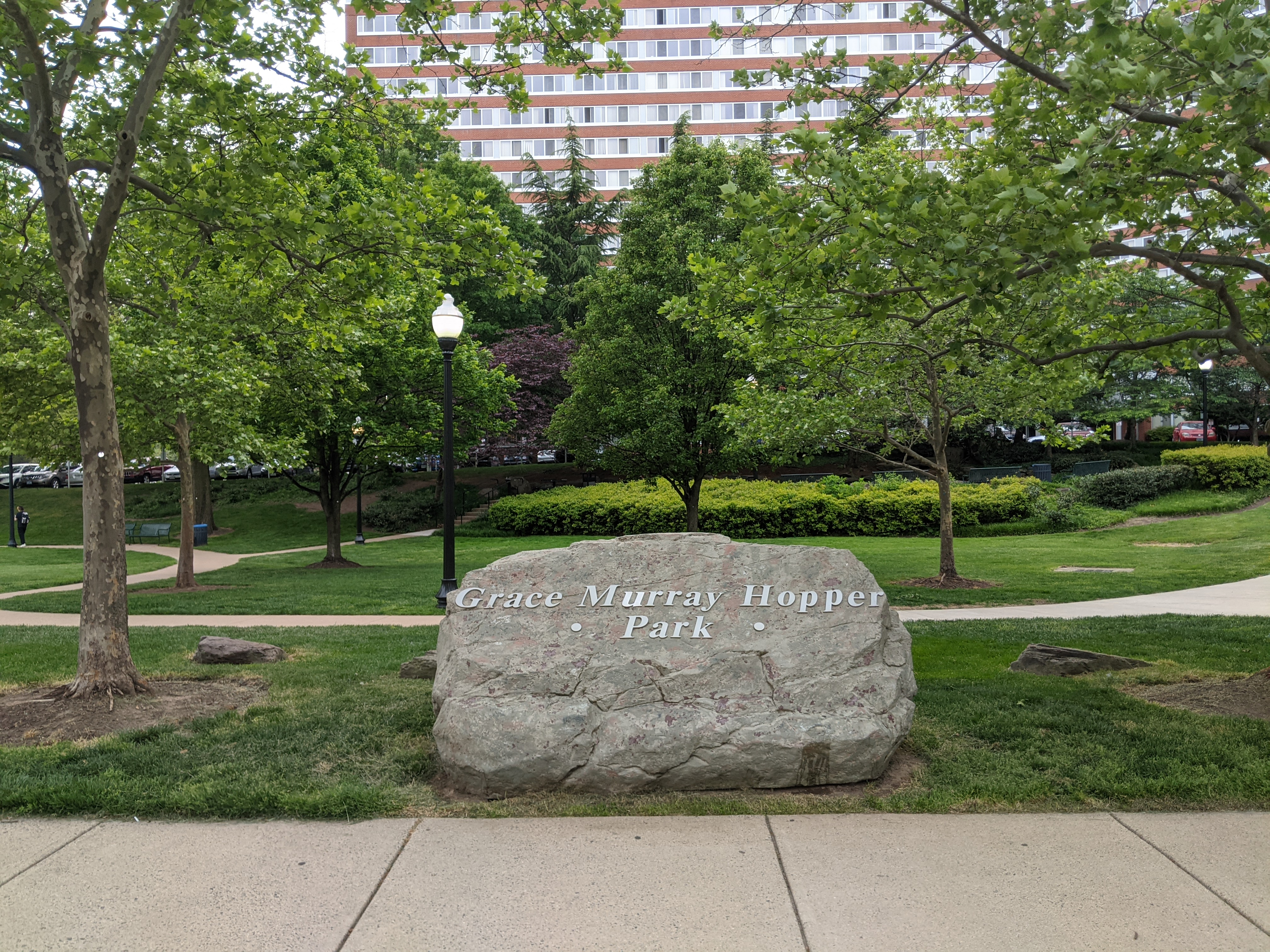
Grace Murray Hopper Park

Grace Murray Hopper Park is a small memorial park in Arlington, Virginia. The park is named in honor of Grace Hopper, a computer scientist and naval officer. The park is near Riverhouse, a high-rise community where Hopper lived her later years. The park was originally funded by private sources, but is now owned by Arlington. The park is located across the I-395 corridor from The Pentagon.
