= Harvard Mark IV =

Electronic stored-program computer built at Harvard University in 1952

- Developer: Howard Aiken
- Manufacturer: Harvard University
- Released: 1952; 74 years ago
- Predecessor: Harvard Mark III

The Harvard Mark IV was an electronic stored-program computer built by Harvard University under the supervision of Howard Aiken for the United States Air Force. The computer was completed in 1952. It stayed at Harvard, where the Air Force used it extensively.

The Mark IV was all electronic. The Mark IV used a magnetic drum and had 200 registers of ferrite magnetic-core memory (one of the first computers to do so). It separated the storage of data and instructions in what is now sometimes referred to as the Harvard architecture; however, in the context of microcontrollers, the term was not coined until the 1970s.

== See also ==
- Harvard Mark I
- Harvard Mark II
- Harvard Mark III
- List of vacuum-tube computers
