= Grace Hopper =

U.S. naval officer and computer scientist (1906–1992)

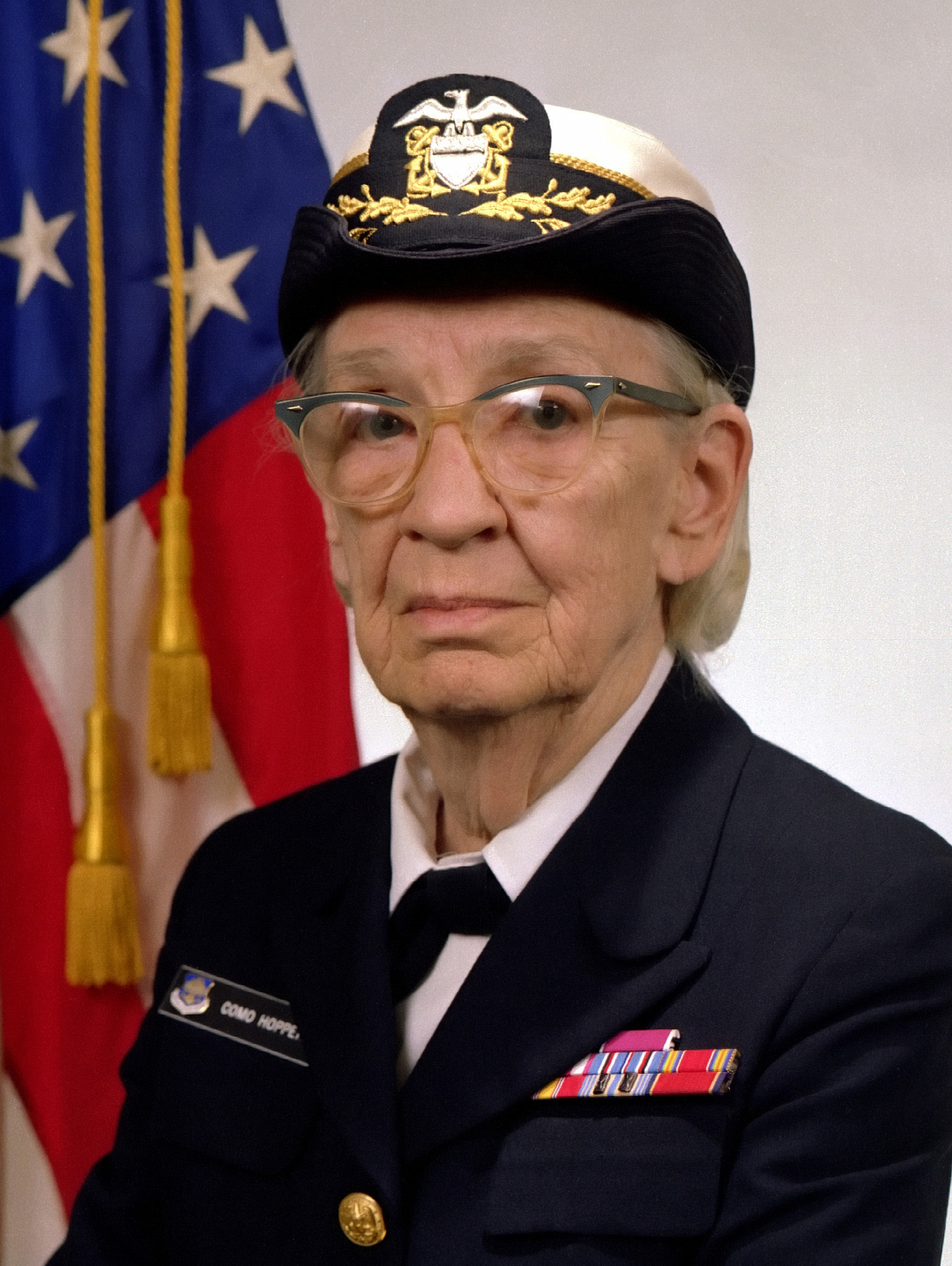
- Hopper in 1984
- Born: Grace Brewster Murray; December 9, 1906; New York City, U.S.
- Died: January 1, 1992 (aged 85); Arlington County, Virginia, U.S.
- Resting place: Arlington National Cemetery
- Education: Vassar College (BA); Yale University (MS, PhD)
- Spouse: Vincent Hopper (m. 1930; div. 1945)
- Awards: Defense Distinguished Service Medal; Legion of Merit; Meritorious Service Medal; American Campaign Medal; World War II Victory Medal; National Defense Service Medal; Armed Forces Reserve Medal with two Hourglass Devices; Naval Reserve Medal; Presidential Medal of Freedom (posthumous)
- Military career
- Allegiance: United States
- Branch: United States Navy
- Service years: 1943–1986
- Rank: Rear admiral (lower half)
- Scientific career
- Known for: FLOW-MATIC; COBOL
- Fields: Computer science Mathematics
- Workplaces: Vassar College; Yale University; Harvard University; University of Pennsylvania; Eckert–Mauchly Computer Corporation; Remington Rand; Digital Equipment Corporation
- Thesis: New Types of Irreducibility Criteria (1934)
- Doctoral advisor: Øystein Ore

Grace Brewster Hopper (née Murray; December 9, 1906 – January 1, 1992) was an American computer scientist, mathematician, and United States Navy rear admiral. She was a pioneer of computer programming. Hopper was the first to devise the theory of machine-independent programming languages, and used this theory to develop the FLOW-MATIC programming language, which was a major influence on COBOL, an early high-level programming language still in use today. She was also one of the first programmers on the Harvard Mark I computer. She is credited with writing the first computer manual, "A Manual of Operation for the Automatic Sequence Controlled Calculator", and is often credited with creating the first compiler.

Before joining the Navy, Hopper earned a Ph.D. in mathematics from Yale University and was a professor of mathematics at Vassar College. She left her position at Vassar to join the United States Navy Reserve during World War II. Hopper began her computing career in 1944 as a member of the Harvard Mark I team, led by Howard H. Aiken. In 1949, she joined the Eckert–Mauchly Computer Corporation and was part of the team that developed the UNIVAC I computer.

At Eckert–Mauchly she managed the development of one of the first COBOL compilers. She believed that programming should be simplified with an English-based computer programming language, which would be translated into machine code through a secondary program called a compiler. By 1952, Hopper had finished her program (Note: While she called this program a compiler, in a modern system it would be a subcomponent of a compiler called a linker), which was written for the A-0 System. In 1954, Eckert–Mauchly chose Hopper to lead their department for automatic programming, and she led the release of some of the first compiled languages like FLOW-MATIC. In 1959, she participated in the CODASYL consortium, helping to create a machine-independent programming language called COBOL, which was based on English words. Hopper promoted the use of the language throughout the 1960s.

The U.S. Navy Arleigh Burke-class guided-missile destroyer USS Hopper was named for her, as was the Cray XE6 "Hopper" supercomputer at NERSC, the "Grace" supercomputing cluster at Texas A&M University, and the Nvidia GPU architecture "Hopper". During her lifetime, Hopper was awarded 40 honorary degrees from universities across the world. A college at Yale University was renamed in her honor. In 1991, she received the National Medal of Technology. On November 22, 2016, she was posthumously awarded the Presidential Medal of Freedom by President Barack Obama. In 2024, the Institute of Electrical and Electronics Engineers (IEEE) dedicated a plaque at the University of Pennsylvania in honor of invention the A-0 compiler, that functioned as a linker/loader, by Grace Hopper during her time as a lecturer in the School of Engineering.

== Early life and education ==
Grace Brewster Murray was born in New York City. She was the eldest of three children. Her parents, Walter Fletcher Murray and Mary Campbell Van Horne, were of Scottish and Dutch descent, and attended West End Collegiate Church. Her great-grandfather, Alexander Wilson Russell, an admiral in the US Navy, fought in the Battle of Mobile Bay during the Civil War.

Grace was very curious as a child; this was a lifelong trait. At the age of seven, she decided to determine how an alarm clock worked and dismantled seven alarm clocks before her mother realized what she was doing (she was then limited to only one clock). Later in life, she was known for keeping a clock that ran backward; she explained, "Humans are allergic to change. They love to say, 'We've always done it this way.' I try to fight that. That's why I have a clock on my wall that runs counterclockwise." For her preparatory school education, she attended the Hartridge School in Plainfield, New Jersey. Grace was initially rejected for early admission to Vassar College at age 16 (because her test scores in Latin were too low), but she was admitted the next year. She graduated Phi Beta Kappa from Vassar in 1928 with a bachelor's degree in mathematics and physics and earned her master's degree at Yale University in 1930.

In 1930, Grace Murray married New York University professor Vincent Foster Hopper (1906–1976); they divorced in 1945. She did not marry again and retained his surname.

In 1934, Hopper earned a Ph.D. in mathematics from Yale under the direction of Øystein Ore. Her dissertation, "New Types of Irreducibility Criteria", was published that year. She began teaching mathematics at Vassar in 1931, and was promoted to associate professor in 1941.

== Career ==
=== World War II ===
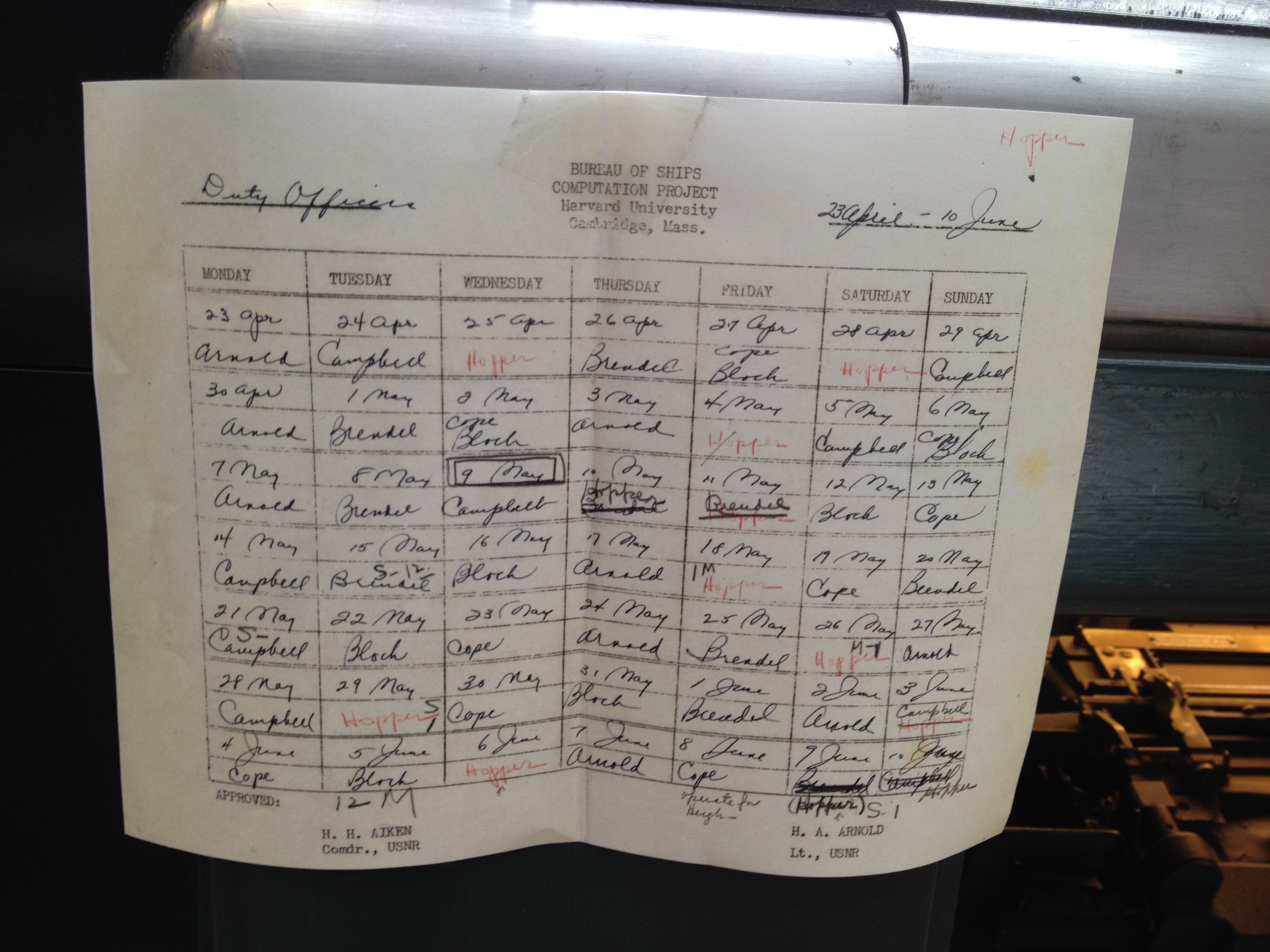
Hopper's name on a duty roster for the Bureau of Ships Computation Project at Harvard, which built and operated the Mark I

Hopper tried to be commissioned in the Navy early in World War II, however she was turned down. At age 34, she was too old to enlist and her weight-to-height ratio was too low. She was also denied on the basis that her job as a mathematician and mathematics professor at Vassar College was valuable to the war effort. During the war in 1943, Hopper obtained a leave of absence from Vassar and was sworn into the United States Navy Reserve; she was one of many women who volunteered to serve in the WAVES.

She had to get an exemption to be commissioned; she was 15 pounds (6.8 kg) below the Navy minimum weight of 120 pounds (54 kg). She reported in December and trained at the Naval Reserve Midshipmen's School at Smith College in Northampton, Massachusetts. Hopper graduated first in her class in 1944, and was assigned to the Bureau of Ships Computation Project at Harvard University as a lieutenant, junior grade. She served on the Mark I computer programming staff headed by Howard H. Aiken.

Hopper and Aiken co-authored three papers on the Mark I, also known as the Automatic Sequence Controlled Calculator. Hopper's request to transfer to the regular Navy, out of WAVES, at the end of the war was denied due to being two years older than the cutoff age of 38. She continued to serve in the Navy Reserve. Hopper remained at the Harvard Computation Lab until 1949, turning down a full professorship at Vassar in favor of working as a research fellow under a Navy contract at Harvard.

=== UNIVAC ===
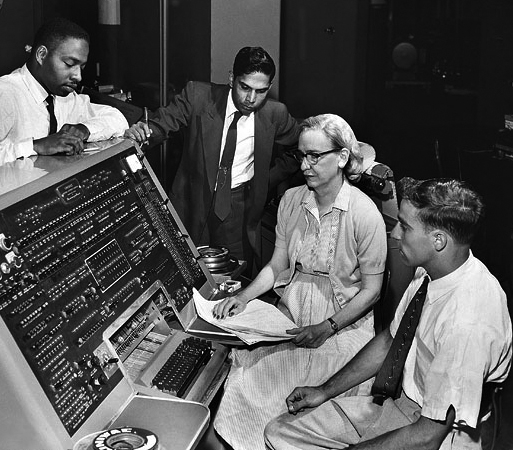
Hopper at the UNIVAC I console, c. 1960

In 1949, Hopper became an employee of the Eckert–Mauchly Computer Corporation as a senior mathematician and joined the team developing the UNIVAC I. Hopper also served as UNIVAC director of Automatic Programming Development for Remington Rand. The UNIVAC was the first known large-scale electronic computer to be on the market in 1951.

When Hopper recommended the development of a new programming language that would use entirely English words, she "was told very quickly that [she] couldn't do this because computers didn't understand English." Still, she persisted. "It's much easier for most people to write an English statement than it is to use symbols", she explained. "So I decided data processors ought to be able to write their programs in English, and the computers would translate them into machine code."

Her idea was not accepted for three years. In the meantime, she published her first paper on the subject, compilers, in 1952. In the early 1950s, the company was taken over by the Remington Rand corporation, and it was while she was working for them that her original compiler work was done. The program was known as the A compiler and its first version was A-0.

In 1952, she had an operational link-loader, which at the time was referred to as a compiler. She later said that "Nobody believed that", and that she "had a running compiler and nobody would touch it. They told me computers could only do arithmetic."

In 1954 Hopper was named the company's first director of automatic programming. Beginning in 1954, Hopper's work was influenced by the Laning and Zierler system, which was the first compiler to accept algebraic notation as input. Her department released some of the first compiler-based programming languages, including MATH-MATIC and FLOW-MATIC.

Hopper said that her compiler A-0, "translated mathematical notation into machine code. Manipulating symbols was fine for mathematicians but it was no good for data processors who were not symbol manipulators. Very few people are really symbol manipulators. If they are, they become professional mathematicians, not data processors. It's much easier for most people to write an English statement than it is to use symbols. So I decided data processors ought to be able to write their programs in English, and the computers would translate them into machine code. That was the beginning of COBOL, a computer language for data processors. I could say 'Subtract income tax from pay' instead of trying to write that in octal code or using all kinds of symbols. COBOL is the major language used today in data processing."

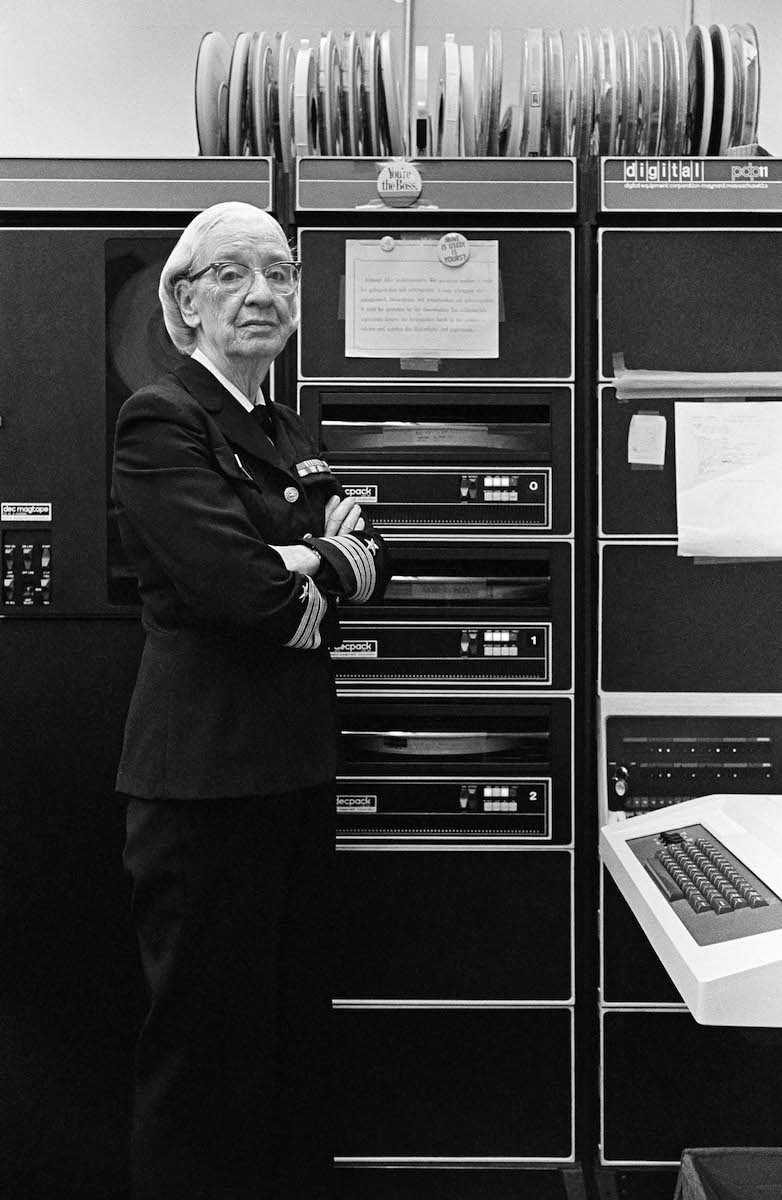
Hopper in a computer room in Washington, D.C., 1978, photographed by Lynn Gilbert

=== COBOL ===
In the spring of 1959, computer experts from industry and government were brought together in a two-day conference known as the Conference on Data Systems Languages (CODASYL). Hopper served as a technical consultant to the committee, and many of her former employees served on the short-term committee that defined the new language COBOL (an acronym for COmmon Business-Oriented Language). The new language extended Hopper's FLOW-MATIC language with some ideas from the IBM equivalent, COMTRAN. Hopper's belief that programs should be written in a language that was close to English (rather than in machine code or in languages close to machine code, such as assembly languages) was captured in the new business language, and COBOL went on to be the most ubiquitous business language to date. Among the members of the committee that worked on COBOL was Mount Holyoke College alumna Jean E. Sammet.

From 1967 to 1977, Hopper served as the director of the Navy Programming Languages Group in the Navy's Office of Information Systems Planning and was promoted to the rank of captain in 1973. She developed validation software for COBOL and its compiler as part of a COBOL standardization program for the entire Navy.

=== Standards ===
In the 1970s, Hopper advocated for the Defense Department to replace large, centralized systems with networks of small, distributed computers. Any user on any computer node could access common databases on the network. She developed the implementation of standards for testing computer systems and components, most significantly for early programming languages such as FORTRAN and COBOL. The Navy tests for conformance to these standards led to significant convergence among the programming language dialects of the major computer vendors. In the 1980s, these tests (and their official administration) were assumed by the National Bureau of Standards (NBS), known today as the National Institute of Standards and Technology (NIST).

== Retirement ==
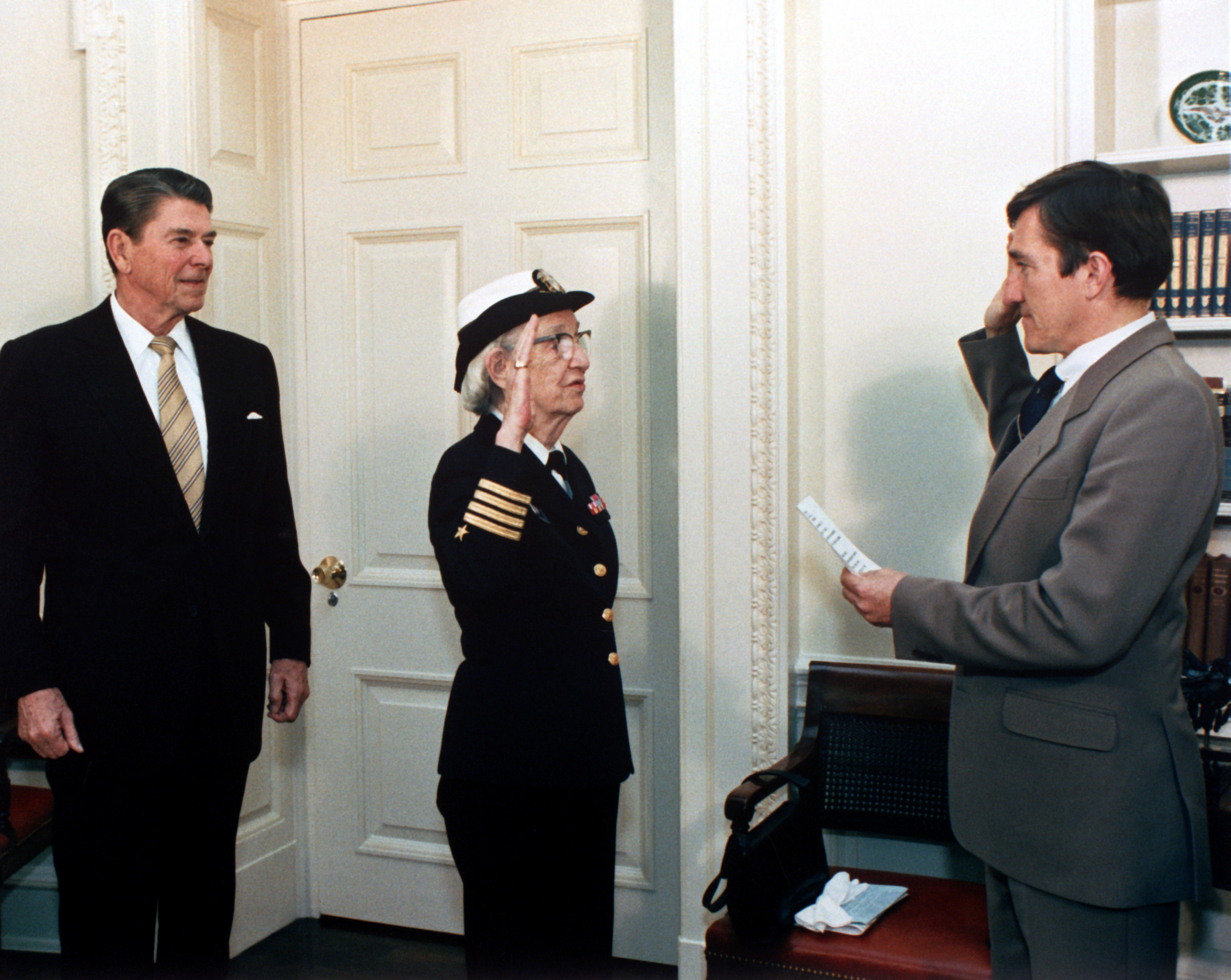
Hopper being promoted to the rank of commodore in 1983

In accordance with Navy attrition regulations, Hopper retired from the Naval Reserve with the rank of commander at age 60 at the end of 1966. She was recalled to active duty in August 1967 for a six-month period that turned into an indefinite assignment. She again retired in 1971 but was again asked to return to active duty in 1972. She was promoted to captain in 1973 by Admiral Elmo R. Zumwalt Jr.

After Republican Representative Philip Crane saw her on a March 1983 segment of 60 Minutes, he championed a joint resolution to promote Hopper to commodore on the retired list; the resolution was referred to, but not reported out of, the Senate Armed Services Committee. Hopper was instead promoted to commodore on December 15, 1983, via the Appointments Clause by President Ronald Reagan. She remained on active duty for several years beyond mandatory retirement by special approval of Congress. Effective November 8, 1985, the rank of commodore was renamed rear admiral (lower half) and Hopper became one of the Navy's few female admirals.

After a career that spanned more than 42 years, Hopper retired from the Navy on August 14, 1986. At the time, she was the oldest serving member of the Navy. At a celebration held in Boston on the USS Constitution to commemorate her retirement, Hopper was awarded the Defense Distinguished Service Medal, the highest non-combat decoration awarded by the Department of Defense.

At the time of her retirement, she was the oldest active-duty commissioned officer in the United States Navy (79 years, eight months and five days), and had her retirement ceremony aboard the oldest commissioned ship in the United States Navy (188 years, 9 months, 23 days).

== Post-retirement ==
After her retirement from the Navy, Hopper was hired as a senior consultant to Digital Equipment Corporation (DEC). Hopper was initially offered a position by Rita Yavinsky, but she insisted on going through the typical formal interview process. She then proposed in jest that she would be willing to accept a position which made her available on alternating Thursdays, exhibited at their museum of computing as a pioneer, in exchange for a generous salary and unlimited expense account. Instead, she was hired as a full-time Principal Corporate Consulting Engineer, a tech-track SVP-equivalent. In this position, Hopper represented the company at industry forums, serving on various industry committees, along with other obligations. She retained that position until her death at age 85 in 1992.

At DEC Hopper served primarily as a goodwill ambassador. She lectured widely about the early days of computing, her career, and on efforts that computer vendors could take to make life easier for their users. She visited most of Digital's engineering facilities, where she generally received a standing ovation at the conclusion of her remarks. Although no longer a serving officer, she always wore her Navy full dress uniform to these lectures contrary to U.S. Department of Defense policy. In 2016 Hopper posthumously received the Presidential Medal of Freedom, the nation's highest civilian honor, in recognition of her remarkable contributions to the field of computer science.

"The most important thing I've accomplished, other than building the compiler," she said, "is training young people. They come to me, you know, and say, 'Do you think we can do this?' I say, 'Try it.' And I back 'em up. They need that. I keep track of them as they get older and I stir 'em up at intervals so they don't forget to take chances."

== Anecdotes ==
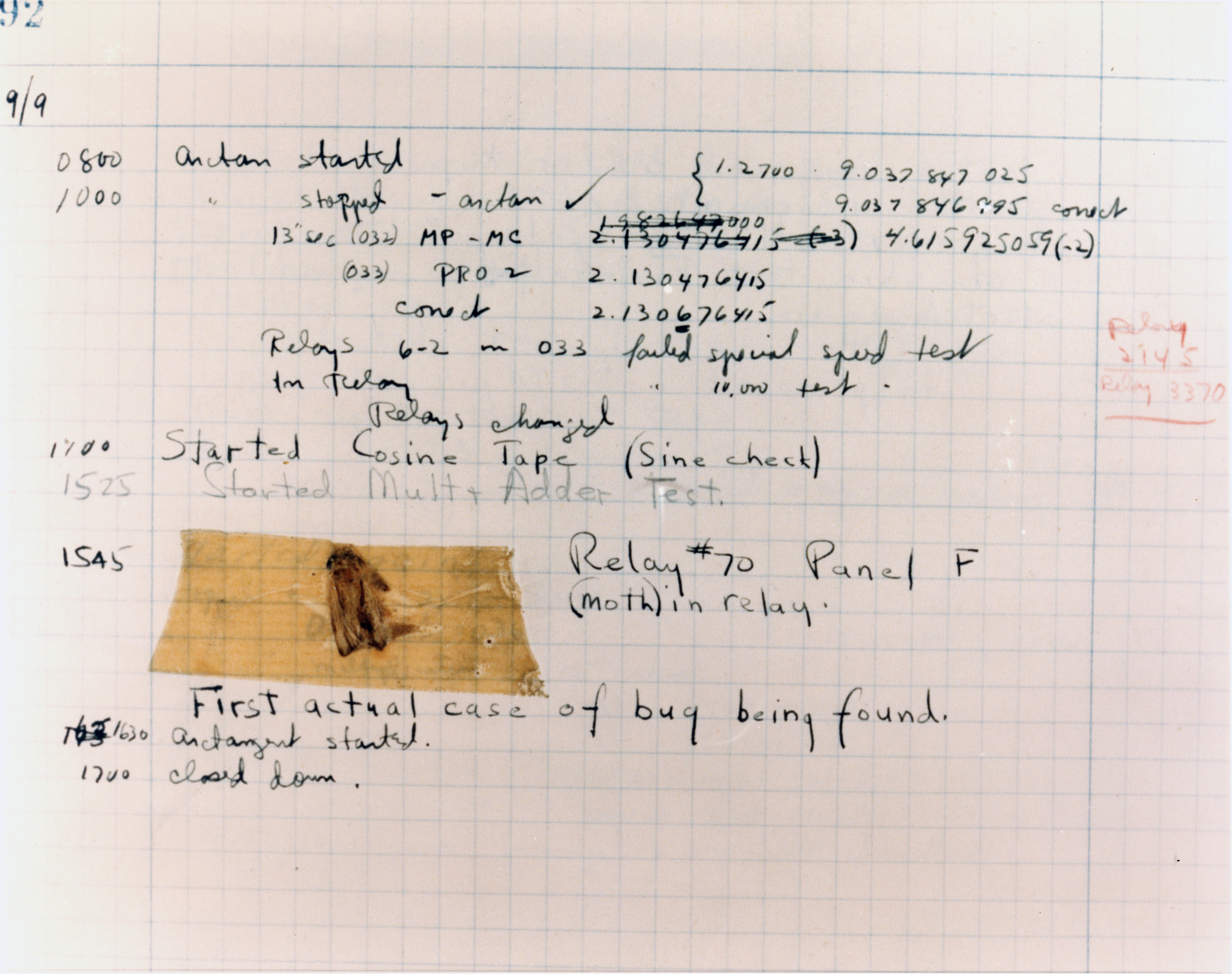
Log book showing the "bug" found caught in a Mark II relay

Throughout much of her later career, Hopper was much in demand as a speaker at various computer-related events. She was well known for her lively and irreverent speaking style, as well as a rich treasury of early war stories. She also received the nickname "Grandma COBOL".

While Hopper was working on a Mark II Computer at Harvard University in 1947, her associates discovered a moth that was stuck in a relay and impeding the operation of the computer. Upon extraction, the insect was affixed to a log sheet for that day with the notation, "First actual case of bug being found". While neither she nor her crew members mentioned the exact phrase, "debugging", in their log entries, the case is held as a historical instance of "debugging" a computer and Hopper is credited with popularizing the term in computing. For many decades, the term "bug" for a malfunction had been in use in several fields before being applied to computers. The remains of the moth can be found taped into the group's log book at the Smithsonian Institution's National Museum of American History in Washington, D.C.

Hopper became known for her nanoseconds visual aid. People (such as generals and admirals) used to ask her why satellite communication took so long. She started handing out pieces of wire that were just under one foot long—11.8 inches (30 cm)—the distance that light travels in one nanosecond. She gave these pieces of wire the metonym "nanoseconds". She was careful to tell her audience that the length of her nanoseconds was actually the maximum distance the signals would travel in a vacuum in a nanosecond, and that signals would travel more slowly through the actual wires that were her teaching aids. Later she used the same pieces of wire to illustrate why computers had to be small to be fast. At many of her talks and visits, she handed out "nanoseconds" to everyone in the audience, contrasting them with a coil of wire 984 feet (300 meters) long, representing a microsecond. Later, while giving these lectures while working for DEC, she passed out packets of pepper, calling the individual grains of ground pepper picoseconds.

Jay Elliot described Hopper as appearing to be "'all Navy', but when you reach inside, you find a 'Pirate' dying to be released".

== Death ==
On New Year's Day 1992, Hopper died in her sleep of natural causes at her home in Arlington County, Virginia; she was 85 years of age. She was interred with full military honors in Arlington National Cemetery.

== Dates of rank ==
Rank	Midshipman MIDN	Lieutenant junior grade O-2	Lieutenant O-3	Lieutenant commander O-4	Commander O-5	Captain O-6	Commodore/ Rear admiral (lower half) O-7
Insignia	N/A						
Date	May 4, 1944	June 27, 1944	June 1, 1946	April 1, 1952	July 1, 1957 (Note: On the retired list from December 31, 1966, to August 1, 1967, and from 1971 to 1972.)	August 2, 1973	December 15, 1983/ redesignated November 8, 1985

== Awards and honors ==
=== Military awards ===

Defense Distinguished Service Medal (1986)	Legion of Merit (1967)	Meritorious Service Medal (1980)
Presidential Medal of Freedom (2016, Posthumous)	American Campaign Medal (1944)	World War II Victory Medal (1945)
National Defense Service Medal with bronze service star (1953, 1966)	Armed Forces Reserve Medal with two bronze hourglass devices (1963, 1973, 1983)	Naval Reserve Medal (1953)

=== Other awards ===
- 1964: Hopper was awarded the Society of Women Engineers Achievement Award, the Society's highest honor, "In recognition of her significant contributions to the burgeoning computer industry as an engineering manager and originator of automatic programming systems." In May 1950, Hopper was one of the founding members of the Society of Women Engineers.
- 1969: Hopper was awarded the inaugural Data Processing Management Association Man of the Year award (now called the Distinguished Information Sciences Award).
- 1971: The annual Grace Murray Hopper Award for Outstanding Young Computer Professionals was established in 1971 by the Association for Computing Machinery.
- 1973: Elected to the U.S. National Academy of Engineering.
- 1973: First American and first woman of any nationality to be made a Distinguished Fellow of the British Computer Society.
- 1981: Received an Honorary PhD from Clarkson University.
- 1982: American Association of University Women Achievement Award and an honorary Doctor of Science from Marquette University.
- 1983: Golden Plate Award of the American Academy of Achievement.
- 1985: Honorary Doctor of Science from Wright State University
- 1985: Honorary Doctor of Letters from Western New England College (now Western New England University).
- 1986: Received the Defense Distinguished Service Medal at her retirement.
- 1986: Received an honorary Doctor of Science from Syracuse University.
- 1987: She became the first Computer History Museum Fellow Award Recipient "for contributions to the development of programming languages, for standardization efforts, and for lifelong naval service."
- 1988: Received the Golden Gavel Award, Toastmasters International.
- 1991: National Medal of Technology "For her pioneering accomplishments in the development of computer programming languages that simplified computer technology and opened the door to a significantly larger universe of users."
- 1991: Elected a Fellow of the American Academy of Arts and Sciences.
- 1992: The Society of Women Engineers established three annual, renewable, "Admiral Grace Murray Hopper Scholarships"
- 1994: Inducted into the National Women's Hall of Fame.
- 1996: USS Hopper (DDG-70) was launched. Nicknamed Amazing Grace, it is on a very short list of U.S. military vessels named after women.
- 2001: Eavan Boland wrote a poem dedicated to Grace Hopper titled "Code" in her 2001 release Against Love Poetry.
- 2001: The Gracies, the Government Technology Leadership Award were named in her honor.
- 2009: The Department of Energy's National Energy Research Scientific Computing Center named its flagship system "Hopper".
- 2009: Office of Naval Intelligence created the Grace Hopper Information Services Center.
- 2013: Google made the Google Doodle for Hopper's 107th birthday, an animation of her sitting at a computer, using COBOL to print out her age. At the end of the animation, a moth flies out of the computer.
- 2016: On November 22, 2016, Hopper was posthumously awarded a Presidential Medal of Freedom for her accomplishments in the field of computer science.
- 2017: Hopper College at Yale University was named in her honor.
- 2021: The Admiral Grace Hopper Award was established by the chancellor of the College of Information and Cyberspace (CIC) of the National Defense University to recognize leaders in the fields of information and cybersecurity throughout the National Security community.

== Legacy ==
- Grace Hopper was awarded 40 honorary degrees from universities worldwide during her lifetime.
- Nvidia has named their 2024 CPU generation Grace and GPU generation Hopper after Grace Hopper.
- The Navy's Hopper Information Services Center is named for her.
- The Navy named a guided-missile destroyer Hopper after her.
- In 2019, Time created 89 new covers to celebrate women of the year starting from 1920; it chose Hopper for 1959.
- On June 30, 2021, a satellite named after her (ÑuSat 20 or "Grace", COSPAR 2021-059AU) was launched into space.
- On August 26, 2024, the NSA released a 90-minute talk in 1982 by Hopper in two parts.

=== Places ===
- Grace Hopper Avenue in Monterey, California, is the location of the Navy's Fleet Numerical Meteorology and Oceanography Center as well as the National Weather Service's San Francisco Bay Area forecast office.
- Grace M. Hopper Navy Regional Data Automation Center at Naval Air Station, North Island, California.
- Grace Murray Hopper Park, on South Joyce Street in Arlington County, Virginia, is a small memorial park in front of her former residence (River House Apartments) and is now owned by Arlington County.
- Brewster Academy, a school in Wolfeboro, New Hampshire, United States, dedicated their computer lab to her in 1985, calling it the Grace Murray Hopper Center for Computer Learning. The academy bestows a Grace Murray Hopper Prize to a graduate who excelled in the field of computer systems. Hopper had spent her childhood summers at a family home in Wolfeboro.
- Grace Hopper College, one of the residential colleges of Yale University.
- An administration building on Naval Support Activity Annapolis (previously known as Naval Station Annapolis) in Annapolis, Maryland is named the Grace Hopper Building in her honor.
- In 2020, Hopper Hall became the U.S. Naval Academy's academic building for its cyber science department, and is the first building at any service academy to be named after a woman.
- The US Naval Academy also owns a Cray XC-30 supercomputer named "Grace", hosted at the University of Maryland-College Park.
- Building 1482 aboard Naval Air Station North Island, housing the Naval Computer and Telecommunication Station San Diego, is named the Grace Hopper Building, and also contains the History of Naval Communications Museum.
- Building 6007, C2/CNT West in Aberdeen Proving Ground, Maryland, is named after her.
- The street outside of the Nathan Deal Georgia Cyber Innovation and Training Center in Augusta, Georgia, is named Grace Hopper Lane.
- Grace Hopper Academy is a for-profit immersive programming school in New York City named in Grace Hopper's honor. It opened in January 2016 with the goal of increasing the proportion of women in software engineering careers.
- A bridge over Goose Creek, to join the north and south sides of the Naval Support Activity Charleston side of Joint Base Charleston, South Carolina, is named the Grace Hopper Memorial Bridge in her honor.
- Minor planet 5773 Hopper discovered by Eleanor Helin is named in her honor. The official naming citation was published by the Minor Planet Center on November 8, 2019 (M.P.C. 117229).
- Grace Hopper Hall, a community meeting hall in Orlando, Florida, on the site of the former Orlando Naval Training Center, is named for her.

=== Programs ===
- Women at Microsoft Corporation formed an employee group called Hoppers and established a scholarship in her honor.
- Beginning in 2015, one of the nine competition fields at the FIRST Robotics Competition world championship is named for Hopper.
- A named professorship in the Department of Computer Sciences was established at Yale University in her honor. Joan Feigenbaum was named to this chair in 2008.
- In 2020, Google named its new undersea network cable 'Grace Hopper'. The cable connects the US, UK and Spain and it was estimated to be completed by 2022. Nonetheless, The Grace Hopper cable was completed in 2021, and it stretches 3,900 miles.

=== In popular culture ===
- In Gene Luen Yang's comic book series Secret Coders, the main character is named Hopper Gracie-Hu.
- Since 2013, Hopper's official portrait has been included in the matplotlib python library as sample data to replace the controversial Lenna image.
- In Sid Meier's Civilization VI, players can recruit Hopper as a Great Admiral.

==== Grace Hopper Celebration of Women in Computing ====
Her legacy was an inspiring factor in the creation of the Grace Hopper Celebration of Women in Computing. Held yearly, this conference is designed to bring the research and career interests of women in computing to the forefront. However, in 2026, the celebration was cancelled by AnitaB.org due to a lack of funding on the part of the organizers.

== See also ==
- Bug (engineering)#History
- Code: Debugging the Gender Gap
- List of pioneers in computer science
- Futures techniques
- Systems engineering
- Women in computing
- Hopper (microarchitecture)
- Women in the United States Navy
- List of female United States military generals and flag officers
- Timeline of women in science

== Obituary notices ==
- Betts, Mitch (Computerworld 26: 14, 1992)
- Bromberg, Howard (IEEE Software 9: 103–104, 1992)
- Danca, Richard A. (Federal Computer Week 6: 26–27, 1992)
- Hancock, Bill (Digital Review 9: 40, 1992)
- Power, Kevin (Government Computer News 11: 70, 1992)
- Sammet, J. E. (Communications of the ACM 35 (4): 128–131, 1992)
- Weiss, Eric A. (IEEE Annals of the History of Computing 14: 56–58, 1992)
