= Harvard Mark III =

Electromechanical computer built at Harvard University in 1949

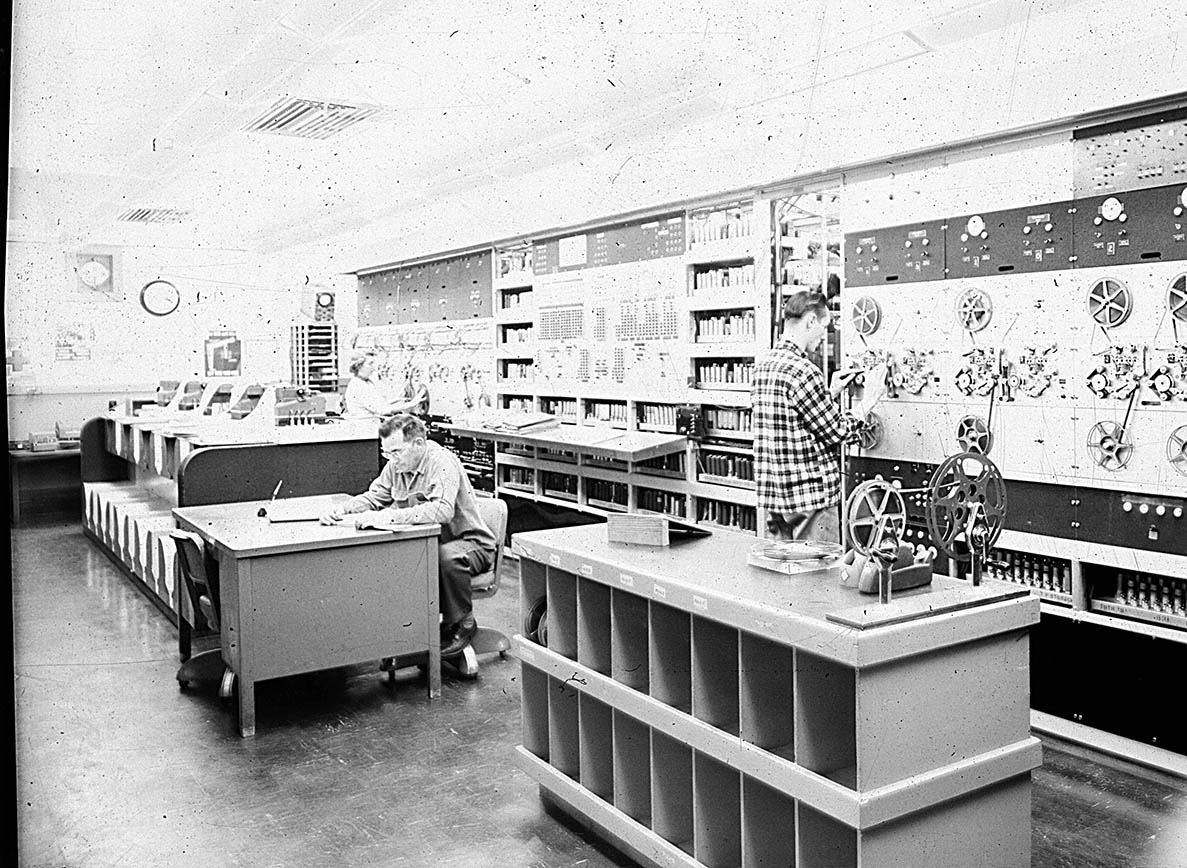
- The Mark III computer room at Dahlgren
- Also known as: ADEC (for Aiken Dahlgren Electronic Calculator)
- Developer: Howard H. Aiken, Benjamin L. Moore
- Manufacturer: Harvard University
- Released: March 1950; 76 years ago
- CPU: 5,000 vacuum tubes
- Weight: 10 tons
- Predecessor: Harvard Mark II
- Successor: Harvard Mark IV

The Harvard Mark III, also known as ADEC (for Aiken Dahlgren Electronic Calculator), was an early computer that was partially electronic and partially electromechanical. It was built at Harvard University under the supervision of Howard Aiken for use at Naval Surface Warfare Center Dahlgren Division.

== Technical overview ==
The Mark III processed numbers of 16 decimal digits (plus sign), each digit was encoded by four bits, though using a form of encoding that is different to conventional binary-coded decimal today. Numbers were read and processed serially, meaning one decimal digit at a time, but the four bits for the digit were read in parallel. The instruction length, however, was 38 bits, read in parallel.

It used 5,000 vacuum tubes and 1,500 crystal diodes. It weighed 10 tons. It used magnetic drum memory of 4,350 words. Its addition time was 4,400 microseconds and the multiplication time was 13,200 microseconds (times include memory access time). In 1950, Aiken claimed that the Mark III was the slowest electronic computer in the world.

Like the previous computers overseen by Aiken, the Mark III was not stored-program. The Mark III used nine magnetic drums (one of the first computers to do so). One drum could contain 4,000 instructions and has an access time of 4,400 microseconds. The arithmetic unit could access two other drums – one contained 150 words of constants and the other contained 200 words of variables. Both of these drums also had an access time of 4,400 microseconds. This separation of data and instructions is now sometimes referred to as the Harvard architecture although that term was not coined until the 1970s (in the context of microcontrollers). There were six other drums that held a total of 4,000 words of data, but the arithmetic unit could not access these drums directly. Data had to be transferred between these drums and the drum the arithmetic unit could access via registers implemented by electromechanical relays. This was a bottleneck in the computer and made the access time to data on these drums long – 80,000 microseconds. This was partially compensated for by the fact that twenty words could be transferred on each access.

The Mark III was finished in September 1949 and delivered to the U.S. Naval Proving Ground at the U.S. Navy base at Dahlgren, Virginia in March 1950. Rebuilding the computer in its new location took the remainder of the year. It became operational in 1951, and was being operated 24 hours a day, 6 days a week by October.
